= Derry Demesne =

Townland in County Tipperary, Ireland

Derry Demesne Irish: Diméin Dhoire
- Townland
- Location in Ireland
- Coordinates: 52°56′12″N 8°20′00″W
- Country: Ireland
- Province: Munster
- County: Tipperary

Derry Demesne (Diméin Dhoire in Irish) is a townland in the historical Barony of Owney and Arra, County Tipperary, Ireland.

== Location ==
The townland is located to the north of Ballina on the shores of Lough Derg to the west of the Arra Mountains.

== Structures of note ==
The entrance gateway and gate lodge of Derry Castle is situated on the R494 road it is listed as being of architectural, artistic and historical significance.

A ringfort and the ruins of a castle stand on a crannog in Lough Derg which is linked to the shore by a causeway. They are scheduled for inclusion in the next revision of the RMP database (a list of recorded archaeological monuments).
