= R496 road (Ireland) =

Road in Ireland

Coordinates: 52.798049°N 8.416556°W

R496 road
- Bóthar R496
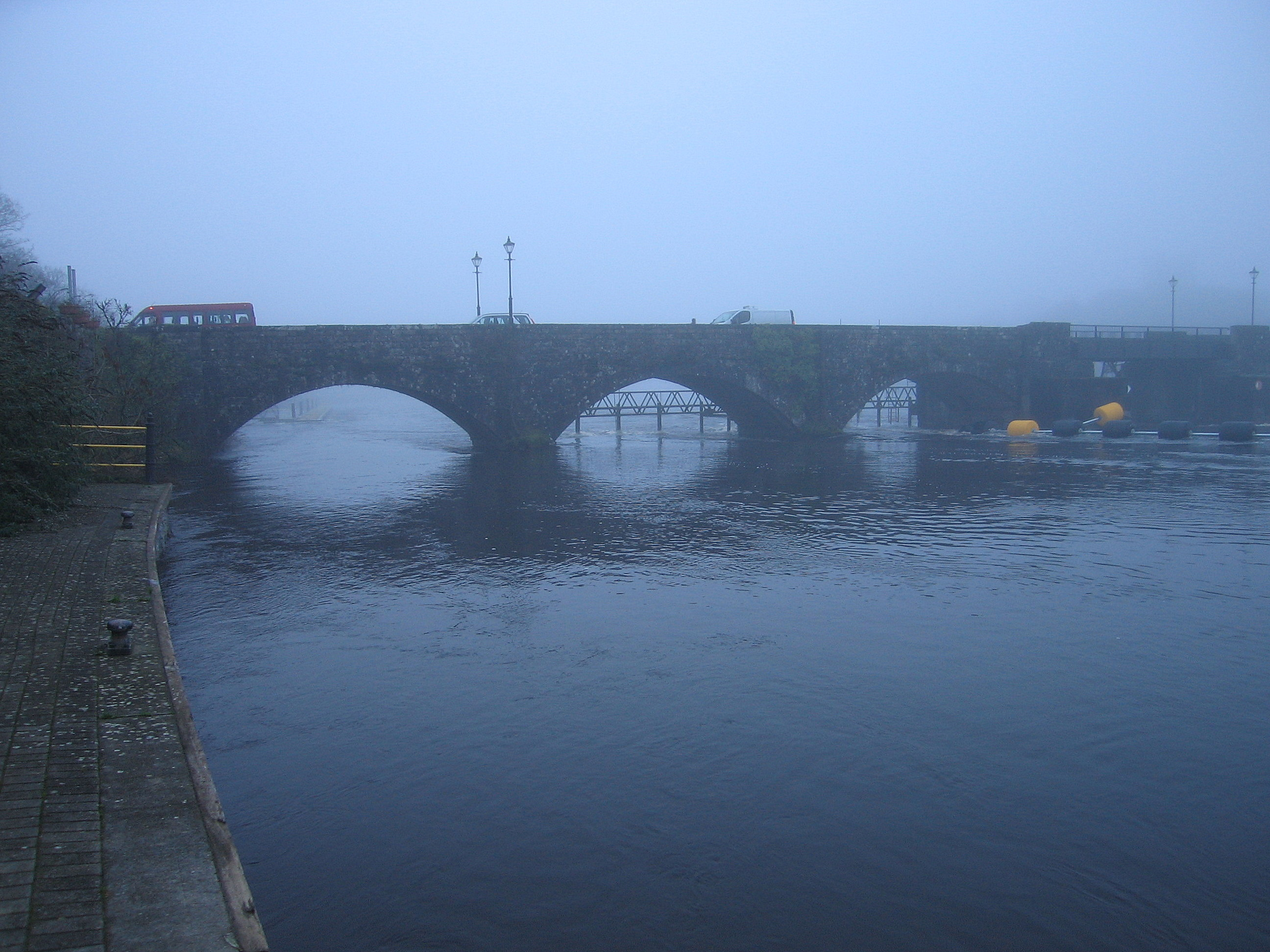
- Killaloe Bridge, the western extreme of the R496

Route information
- Length: 4.3 km (2.7 mi)

Major junctions
- From: R463 Killaloe
- Crosses River Shannon and enters County Tipperary; R494 Ballina; Crosses Roran
- To: R445 Kilmastulla

Location
- Country: Ireland

Highway system
- Roads in Ireland; Motorways; Primary; Secondary; Regional

The R496 road is a regional road in Ireland, located in County Clare and County Tipperary.
