= R494 road (Ireland) =

Road in Ireland

R494 road
- Bóthar R494
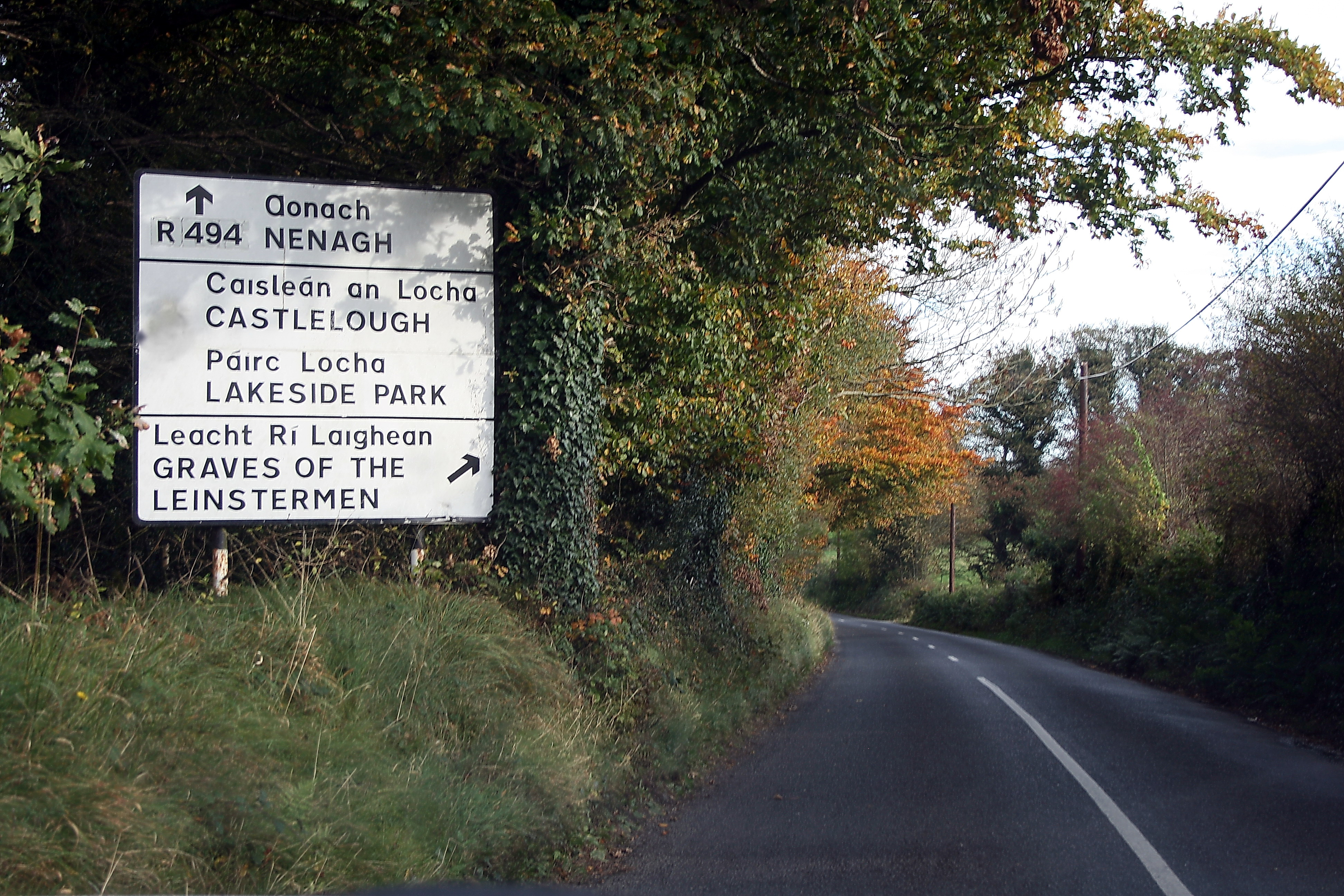
- R494 - Easterners, don't take a right here

Route information
- Length: 29 km (18 mi)

Location
- Country: Ireland
- Primary destinations: County Tipperary; Leaves the M7 at Junction 27 Birdhill; Crosses R445 at roundabout; Crosses Limerick–Ballybrophy railway line; R496; Ballina – linked to the (R463) by bridge across the River Shannon; Lookout over Lough Derg; Portroe; Newtown; (N52 Nenagh Bypass); Nenagh – (R495); terminates at the R445 in town centre

Highway system
- Roads in Ireland; Motorways; Primary; Secondary; Regional

The R494 road is a regional road in Ireland which runs southwest–northeast from Junction 27 of the M7 at Birdhill, County Tipperary to the N52 at Nenagh - all in County Tipperary. It leaves the M7 and loops around the Arra Mountains between the hills and Lough Derg returning to what was the N7 in Nenagh.

After leaving the N7 at Birdhill it heads north to meet the River Shannon at Ballina, where the single lane signal controlled Killaloe Bridge connects it to Killaloe and the R463 on the western bank of the river in County Clare. It continues north for a further 10 km close to the eastern shore of Lough Derg reaching a point several hundred metres from the lake shore but 100 m above it. There is a 'Lookout' point here with extensive views of the lake and the eastern hills of County Clare.

The road next turns eastwards through the villages of Portroe and Newtown before joining the N52 Nenagh bypass as a roundabout junction. It continues into the centre of Nenagh and terminates at the R445 (the former N7 main Dublin - Limerick national route. The route is 29 km (18 mi) long.

== See also ==
- Roads in Ireland
- National primary road
- National secondary road
