= Lough Derg =

Lough Derg is the name of two lakes in Ireland:

- Lough Derg (Shannon), a large lake on the River Shannon, bordering counties Clare, Galway and Tipperary
- Lough Derg, County Donegal, a small lake, a place of Christian pilgrimage

== See also ==
- Lough Derg Way, a long-distance trail in counties Limerick and Tipperary, Ireland
