= Garrykennedy =

Village in County Tipperary, Ireland

Coordinates: 52.9050597°N 8.3452611°W

Garrykennedy Garraí Uí Chinnéide
- Village
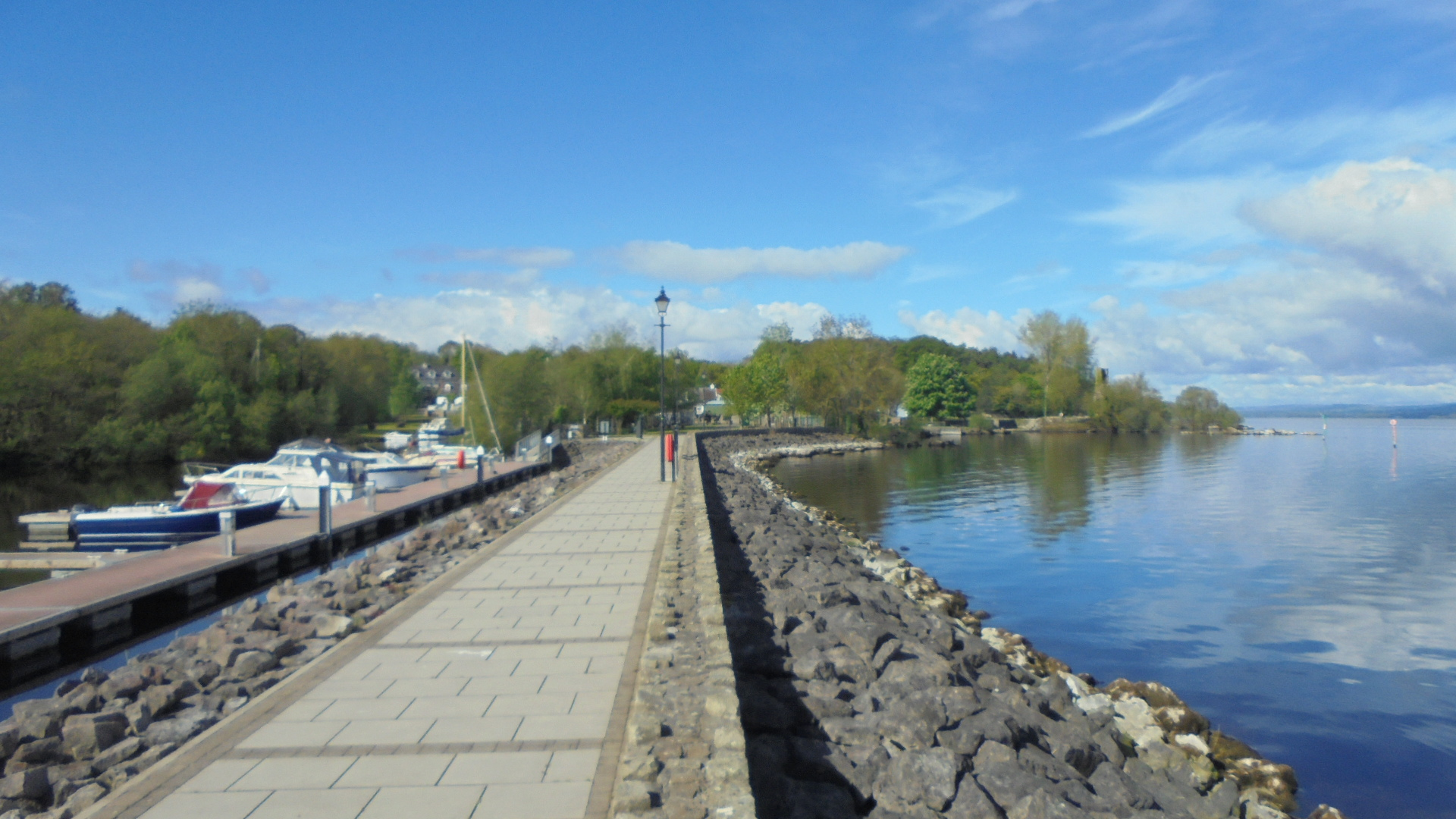
- Interactive map of Garrykennedy
- Country: Ireland
- Province: Munster
- County: Tipperary
- Barony: Owney and Arra
- Civil parish: Castletownarra
- Townland: Garrykennedy
- Elevation: 33 m (108 ft)

Population (2016)
  - Total: 215
- Eircode routing key: E45
- Area code: (+353) 067

Garrykennedy (Garraí Uí Chinnéide in Irish) is a townland, settlement and harbour in the historical Barony of Owney and Arra, County Tipperary, Ireland. It is located on the eastern shore of Lough Derg, 2 km north of Portroe.

== Buildings and structures of note ==
Garrykennedy Castle, a ruined tower house located beside the water was once an O'Kennedy clan home built in the 15th Century. By the mid-17th Century the castle was already a ruin.

The harbour was once important for transporting goods, particularly slate from nearby mines. The present quay, built about 1780 is classified as being of Architectural, Archaeological and Technical interest but is now a leisure facility with a modern marina nearby. Cruisers are particularly attracted here by the local pubs, known for their food and music.

The older harbour has many abandoned boats there.

== Recreation ==
Garrykennedy marina is a popular spot for tourists to park their boats. The Harbour has two mooring spots, a pumpout, a service block and a slipway.

Garrykennedy has a sailing club which organises races and social events during the summer.

There is also a Fishing Club, which holds fishing competitions and has a policy to encourage young people into the sport. It is also active in stream rehabilitation projects in the area.

Garrykennedy Duck Sanctuary is located near the quay.

The Lough Derg Way, a long-distance trail begins in Limerick City and passes through Garrykennedy on its way to Dromineer. It is designated as a National Waymarked Trail by the National Trails Office of the Irish Sports Council and is managed by Shannon Development, Tipperary County Council and Tipperary Integrated Development Company. The trail was reconfigured and relaunched in 2011 with many sections taken off-road aided by an investment of €115,000 under the Comhairle na Tuaithe Walks Scheme, which supports landowners to maintain trails that cross their land. The trail connects with the East Clare Way at Killaoe.

There is a signposted walk through the nearby woods and more unmarked trails. A small rocky shore often referred to as the flat rocks or slippy rock is on the walk. There are also wooden sculptures in the forest and chairs made out of chopped down trees. In 2020 the pathways have had new bridges, steps and concrete and tarmac. Changes have been made to make it more wheelchair accessible, thus improving the quality of the forest.

There is a playground in the harbour made out of wood and multiple barbeque spots for families to cook food.

== Housing and settlements ==
Most of the population is near the harbour.

== Nature and geography ==
The area is mostly flat with slopes gradually rising towards the Arra Mountains. Two streams flow into Lough Derg on each side of the village. Garrykennedy forest has mixture of trees but mostly contains ash, oak and spruce. The shore is home to many waterfowl and the forest is home to many small mammals. A family of swans live on the shore and lay eggs on islands nearby. Some minks live at the shore as well. A heron and a cormorant can be spotted on the lake. There is a small spring in the forest and the shore has small rocks scattered all around.

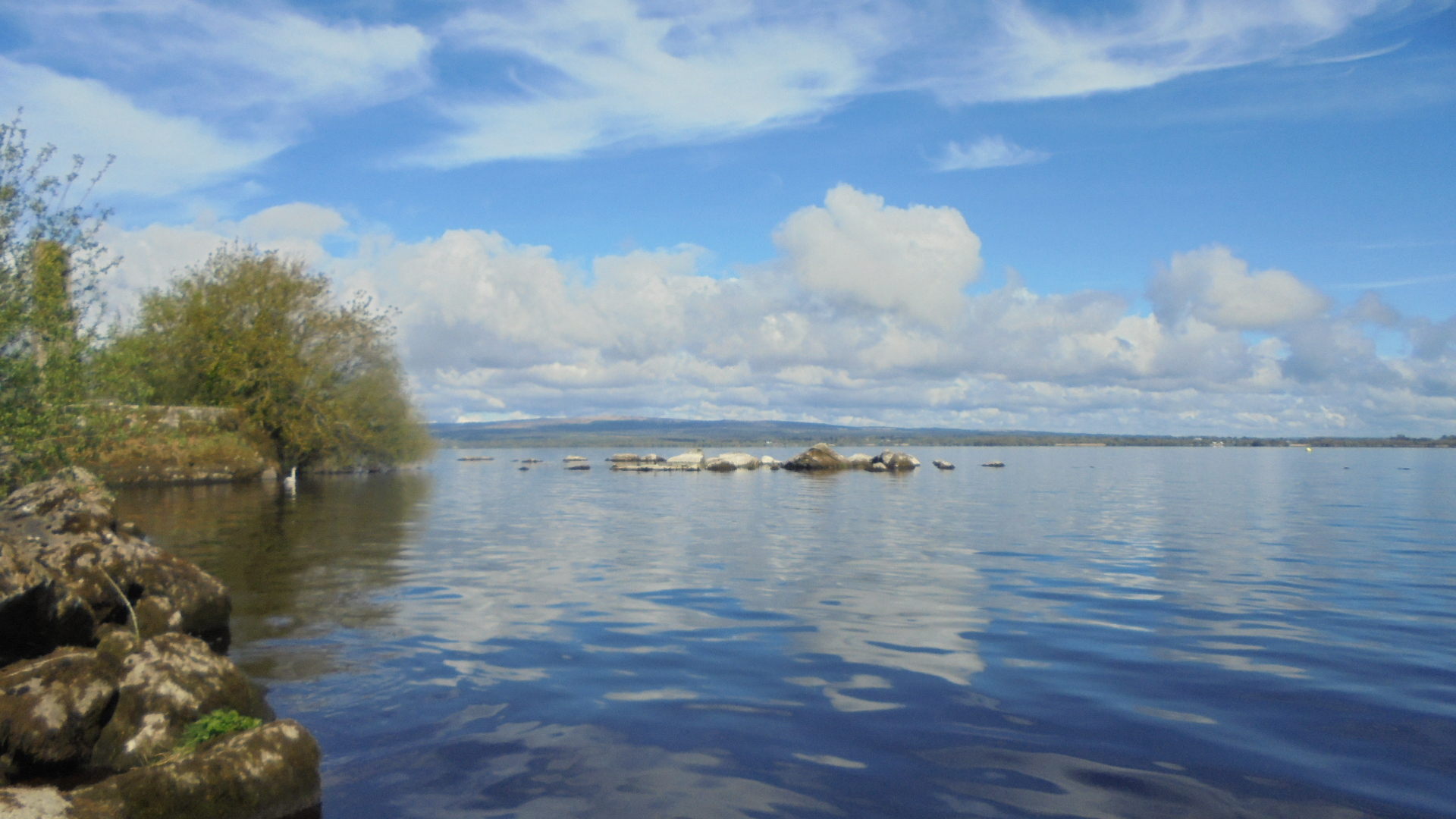
Picture of Lough Derg from Garrykennedy
