= Lough Derg Way =

Trail in Ireland

- Length: 68 km (42 mi)
- Location: Counties Limerick, Clare & Tipperary, Ireland
- Designation: National Waymarked Trail
- Trailheads: Limerick City, Dromineer
- Use: Hiking
- Elevation gain/loss: +527 m (1,729 ft)
- Difficulty: Moderate
- Season: Any

The Lough Derg Way is a long-distance trail in Ireland. It is 68 kilometres (42 miles) long, beginning in Limerick City and ending in Dromineer, County Tipperary. It is typically completed in three days.

== Management and development ==
It is designated as a National Waymarked Trail by the National Trails Office of the Irish Sports Council and is managed by Shannon Development, Tipperary County Council and Tipperary Integrated Development Company. The trail was reconfigured and relaunched in 2011 with many sections taken off-road aided by an investment of €115,000 under the Comhairle na Tuaithe Walks Scheme, which supports landowners to maintain trails that cross their land.

== Route ==
The trail follows the River Shannon and its associated canals from Limerick City to Dromineer on the banks of Lough Derg. Along the way it passes the towns and villages of Clonlara, O'Brien's Bridge, Killaloe, Ballina and Garrykennedy. The trail connects with the East Clare Way at Killaoe.
