= Dromineer =

Village in County Tipperary, Ireland

Dromineer Drom Inbhir
- Village
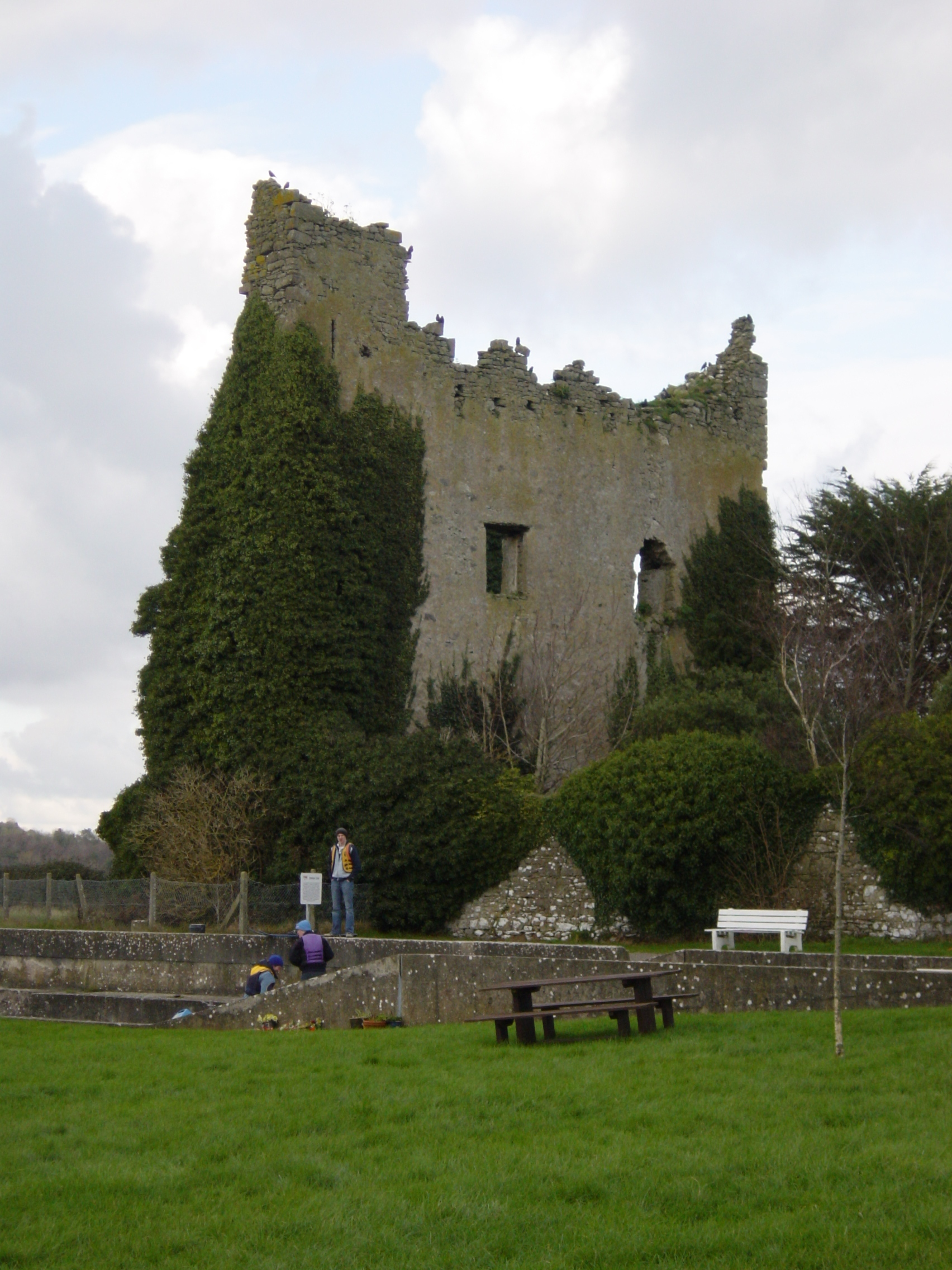
- Dromineer Castle

- Location in Ireland
- Coordinates: 52°55′29″N 8°16′36″W
- Country: Ireland
- Province: Munster
- County: County Tipperary
- Elevation: 43 m (141 ft)

Population (2006)
  - Total: 118
- Time zone: UTC+0 (WET)
  - Summer (DST): UTC-1 (IST (WEST))
- Irish Grid Reference: R815858

Dromineer (Irish: Drom Inbhir/Druim Inbhir, meaning 'ridge of the river mouth') is a small village and townland in County Tipperary, Ireland. It is on the shores of Lough Derg, 8 km north-west of Nenagh (10 km by road) on the R495 road. It is also a civil parish in the historical barony of Ormond Lower. Historic documents describe the places as "Dromynnyre"; the earliest form of the name dating from 1302 was Dromynwyr.

== Features ==
Home to an ivy-clad ruined 13th-century Kennedy tower house, public harbour and other facilities, it is a destination for some tourists, including those interested in boating on the lake. The name Dromineer in Irish is "Drom Inbhir", meaning the back of the ford of the river.

Amenities in Dromineer include a pub with a restaurant, holiday accommodation, a café, a children's playground, a public marina, a private marina and boating clubs.

Dromineer is home to the Lough Derg Lifeboat, which is the RNLI's third inland lifeboat station and was the first inland station in the Republic of Ireland. During 2013 the Lough Derg Lifeboat launched 20 times and rescued 33 people.

== Buildings of note ==
In addition to the O'Kennedy towerhouse (ruined), structures listed as being protected by Tipperary County Council in the area include Dromineer Quay and Canal store. Both of these date from around 1845 (RPS Refs S568 and S569).

Two corrugated iron roofed houses summer houses from the 1920s overlook the lake (RPS Refs S571 and S572).

== Dromineer Castle (tower house) ==
This castle/towerhouse began as a two storey 13th-century hall house and was later converted into a tower house in the 15th/16th century. It was built by the followers of Thomas Butler Esq. in the 13th century. The hall house was originally only two storeys high, but two additional storeys were later added, and vaults added to the ground floor. A base batter is present and can be attributed to the earlier structure. The conversion to a castle/towerhouse has resulted in a rectangular shape to the castle which is 11×15 metres. By 1299, the Cantwell family were tenants, with Thomas Cantwell paying taxes on the castle.

The building then fell into Gaelic hands, and the Ormond O’Kennedys were responsible for the remodelling of the building into a tower house. Many of the windows were modified during the conversion from hall to tower house.

In 1582 the Butler Earls of Ormond re-captured the castle/towerhouse, and the Cantwells returned as tenants until c. 1640.

In the Civil Survey of 1654–56 the castle was described as the "Mannor of Dromineer &c appertaineth a Courte Leete & Courte Barron with all the Rights privileges & immunities belonging to a mannor. Uppon the sd lands stands an old castle, six thatch houses, and fowerteene cottages." The proprietor of the castle in 1640 was John Cantwell, of Cantwells Court, in Kilkenny.

In 1650, the castle was seized by Cromwellian forces and garrisoned. It was returned the Earl of Ormond following the occupation by Cromwell. It was occupied until 1688. The castle/towerhouse fell into ruin in the late 17th century and was sold by the Earl of Ormond in the late 19th century.

A bawn wall also surrounds the castle in places. Many of the large quadrangular windows are 17th-century features.

== Dromineer Church ==
This church may have been built in the 10th century. The tradition states that the monks from Holy Island built it.

It is located in the parish of Puckane & Carrig, which consists of a total of 71 townlands and is 18,310 statute acres or approximately 28.6 square miles in extent. The parish has a number of sites that have Early Christian religious associations, including Dromineer. Folklore recalls four places in the parish where Mass was secretly celebrated during the Penal Days.

The parish was traditionally known as ‘Monsea’, ‘Monsea & Kilodiernan’ or ‘Monsea & Cloughprior’. These names reflect its origins because the present parish is an amalgamation of five medieval parishes, Cloughprior, Dromineer, Kilodiernan, Knigh and Monsea. The ruined churches at Dromineer were built in the Romanesque style, while those at Cloughprior, Knigh and Monsea were built in the Gothic style of the fifteenth century. The graveyards surrounding those churches are still used for burials and Mass is celebrated in each annually.

Church construction employed exceptionally large blocks of stone. It was extended in 12th century in the Celtic Romanesque style. The west doorway was still standing in the 1830s when John O'Donovan was here. Carvings include dogs' heads with bulging eyes. The church is located in the graveyard adjoining the public house.

== Sport and recreation ==
The local GAA club is Kildangan GAA. Fishing is also a popular activity in the area, both on the lake and the nearby Nenagh River.

Boating in Dromineer is served by both public and private marinas. The area is home to Nenagh Boat Club, Shannon Sailing Club and the Lough Derg Yacht Club which is the twenty third-oldest yacht club in the world, and seventh oldest in Ireland having been founded in 1835 and one of two remaining yacht clubs with a fleet of Shannon-One-Design sailing dinghies, the North Shannon Yacht Club having folded.

Dromineer is on one of the North Tipperary Cycle Routes. The 65 km route starts at Banba Square, Nenagh and is listed as a half-day cycle.

The Lough Derg Way is a long-distance walking trail between Limerick City and Dromineer. It is designated as a National Waymarked Trail by the National Trails Office of the Irish Sports Council and is managed by Shannon Development, Tipperary County Council and Tipperary Integrated Development Company. The trail was reconfigured and relaunched in 2011 with many sections taken off-road aided by an investment of €115,000 under the Comhairle na Tuaithe Walks Scheme, which supports landowners to maintain trails that cross their land. The trail connects with the East Clare Way at Killaoe. Sli Eala ("The Way of the Swan" in Irish) is a public walkway between Nenagh and Dromineer. For much of its length it follows the Nenagh River where mute swans can be seen. The route passes Annaghbeg bridge and Ballyartella Mills on its way upstream, a spur off the main route leads to Ballycommon.

== Notable people ==
- Patrick Collison (born 1988) and his brother John Collison (born 1990), billionaire co-founders of Stripe, Inc.

== See also ==
- List of towns and villages in Ireland
- List of civil parishes of Tipperary
