= Caitríona Finn =

Irish rugby player

- Born: 4 June 2006 (age 20) Garrykennedy, Ireland
- Height: 1.78 m (5 ft 10 in)
- Weight: 73 kg (161 lb; 11 st 7 lb)

Rugby union career
- Position: Fly Half/Inside Centre
Senior career
Years	Team	Apps	(Points)
- UL Bohemians
–	Munster		
International career
Years	Team	Apps	(Points)
- Ireland

Caitríona Finn (born 4 June 2006) is an Irish rugby player from Garrykennedy. She plays for UL Bohemians, Munster Rugby, and the Ireland women's national rugby union team.

== Club career ==
Finn started rugby from a young age, eventually joining UL Bohemians as a 13-year-old. Going on to play for Munster Rugby youth sides, before making her senior debut for the province in 2025.

In the 2025 IRFU Women's Interprovincial Series Finn was a key figure in Munster winning their first title since 2022, picking up 3 player of the match nods during the 4 game competition, and was the leading points scorer through the competition, as well as the final at Energia Park.

== International career ==
Finn was first named in the Ireland women's national rugby union team squad for the 2024 WXV competition, however she is still waiting for her first cap as of April 2026.

== Personal life ==
Finn is studying for a Business degree from the University of Limerick. She also operates a YouTube channel which documents her experience in rugby and has garnered a small following from this.
