= George Thew Burke =

Upper Canada politician (1776–1854)

Member of the Legislative Assembly of Upper Canada for Carleton
- In office 1824–1828

Justice of the Peace for Johnstown
- In office 1819–1822

Justice of the Peace for Bathurst
- In office 1822–1825

Personal details
- Born: 1776 Ballyartella, Ireland
- Died: February 2, 1854 (aged 77–78) Bytown, Canada West
- Occupation: Soldier, politician, settler, merchant
- Awards: Military General Service Medal (Egypt clasp)

Military service
- Allegiance: Great Britain; Upper Canada
- Branch/service: British Army; Canadian militia
- Years of service: 1798 - 1830s
- Rank: Ensign; Captain; Colonel
- Unit: Ancient Irish Fencibles; 100th Regiment of Foot; 99th Regiment of Foot; 1st Regiment of Carleton Militia
- Battles/wars: Egyptian Campaign: Battle of Aboukir; Battle of Mandora; Battle of Alexandria; War of 1812: Battle of Queenston Heights; Second Battle of Sacket's Harbor; Battle of the Chateauguay; Battle of Chippawa; Rebellions of 1837–1838

George Thew Burke (1776 – February 2, 1854) was a soldier, merchant and political figure in Upper Canada.

He was born in Ballyartella, County Tipperary, Ireland in 1776. He was a captain in the British Army serving in Canada from 1811 to 1818; he fought under Major General Isaac Brock at the Battle of Queenston Heights. In 1818, he became head of the settlement at Richmond, where a number of members of the army had received free land grants, and he set up a store there. He served in the Carleton militia and was named colonel in 1822. He became a justice of the peace in the Johnstown District in 1819 and in the Bathurst District in 1822. He represented Carleton in the Legislative Assembly of Upper Canada from 1824 to 1828. He died in Bytown in 1854.
