= R495 road (Ireland) =

Road in County Tipperary, Ireland

R495 road
- Bóthar R495
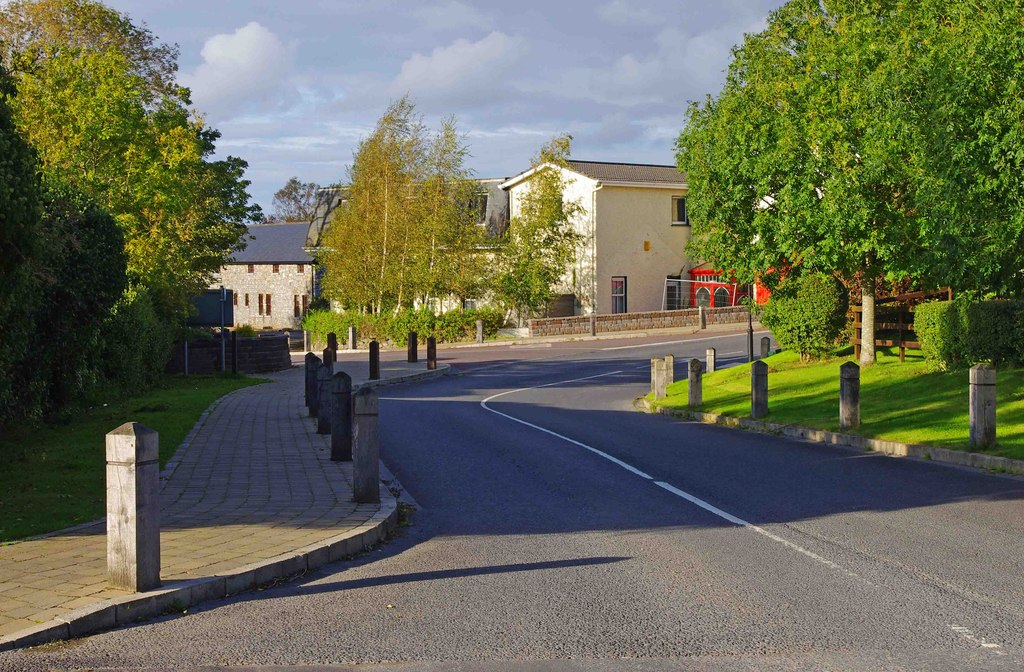
- Dromineer, on the R495

Route information
- Length: 7.6 km (4.7 mi)

Location
- Country: Ireland
- Primary destinations: County Tipperary; Nenagh - Starts at the R494; Crosses the N52 at Dromineer Road roundabout; Ballycommon; Ballyartella; Dromineer, Terminates here

Highway system
- Roads in Ireland; Motorways; Primary; Secondary; Regional

The R495 is a regional road in Ireland. Running entirely within County Tipperary, it starts in Nenagh at Richmond Cross, a junction with the R494, and ends at Dromineer on the shores of Lough Derg. The road is approximately 7.6 km (4.7 mi) long, passing through Ballycommon, Carrkirk, Annaghly Cross and Ballyartella.

== See also ==
- Roads in Ireland - (Primary National Roads)
- Secondary Roads
- Regional Roads
