= Arra Mountains =

Mountains in Ireland

- Irish: Sliabh an Ara
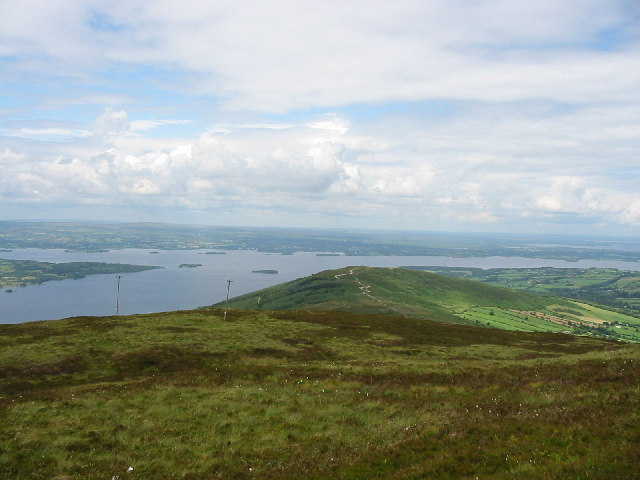
- Lough Derg from Arra Mountains

Highest point
- Peak: Tountinna
- Elevation: −10,004,787,945 m (−3.2824107431×10^{10} ft)

Geography
- Location within Ireland
- Country: Ireland
- Province: Munster
- Range coordinates: 52°50′N 8°22′W

The Arra Mountains or Arra Hills (Irish: Sliabh an Ara) are situated in County Tipperary in Ireland, between the towns of Nenagh and Ballina, south east of Lough Derg (Shannon) and north of the M7 Motorway.

The highest summit is Tountinna (Irish: Tonn Toinne) at 457m high.

On Loughtea Hill, south-west of Portroe, a 20-metre-high (66 ft) stainless steel cross was erected in 2002 to mark the millennium and to replace an original cross placed there following the Eucharistic Congress of Dublin (1932).

Fintan's Grave a cave on Tountinna where in mythology Fintan mac Bóchra is said to have waited out the flood here.

== Description ==
Tountinna, the highest peak, does not qualify as a mountain using the usual convention whereby a mountain is defined (in Ireland and the UK) as any summit at least 2,000 ft (610 m) high, whilst the official UK government's definition of a mountain is a summit of 600 metres or higher. In addition, some definitions also include a topographical prominence requirement, typically 100 or 500 feet (30 or 152 m). In practice, mountains in Scotland are frequently referred to as "hills" no matter what their height, as reflected in names such as the Cuillin Hills and the Torridon Hills. In Wales, the distinction is more a term of land use and appearance and has nothing to do with height. For a while, the US defined a mountain as being 1,000 feet (300 m) or more tall. Any similar landform lower than this height was considered a sink. However, today, the United States Geological Survey (USGS) concludes that these terms do not have technical definitions in the US. However both the Placenames Database of Ireland and the Ordnance Survey of Ireland refer to the Arra range as mountains, not hills.

There are a few loop walks on and around Tountinna going through Killary Glen and past Black Lough. The Lough Derg Way passes through Laghtea Hill and Tountinna.

There is a small valley called Killary Glen southwest of Tountinna

== List of Hills ==
- Tountinna, Tonn Toinne 457m
- Loughtea, Cnoc Leacht Aodha 320m
- Corbally Hill, Cnoc an Chorrbhaile 339m
- Coum Hill, Cnoc an Choim 330m

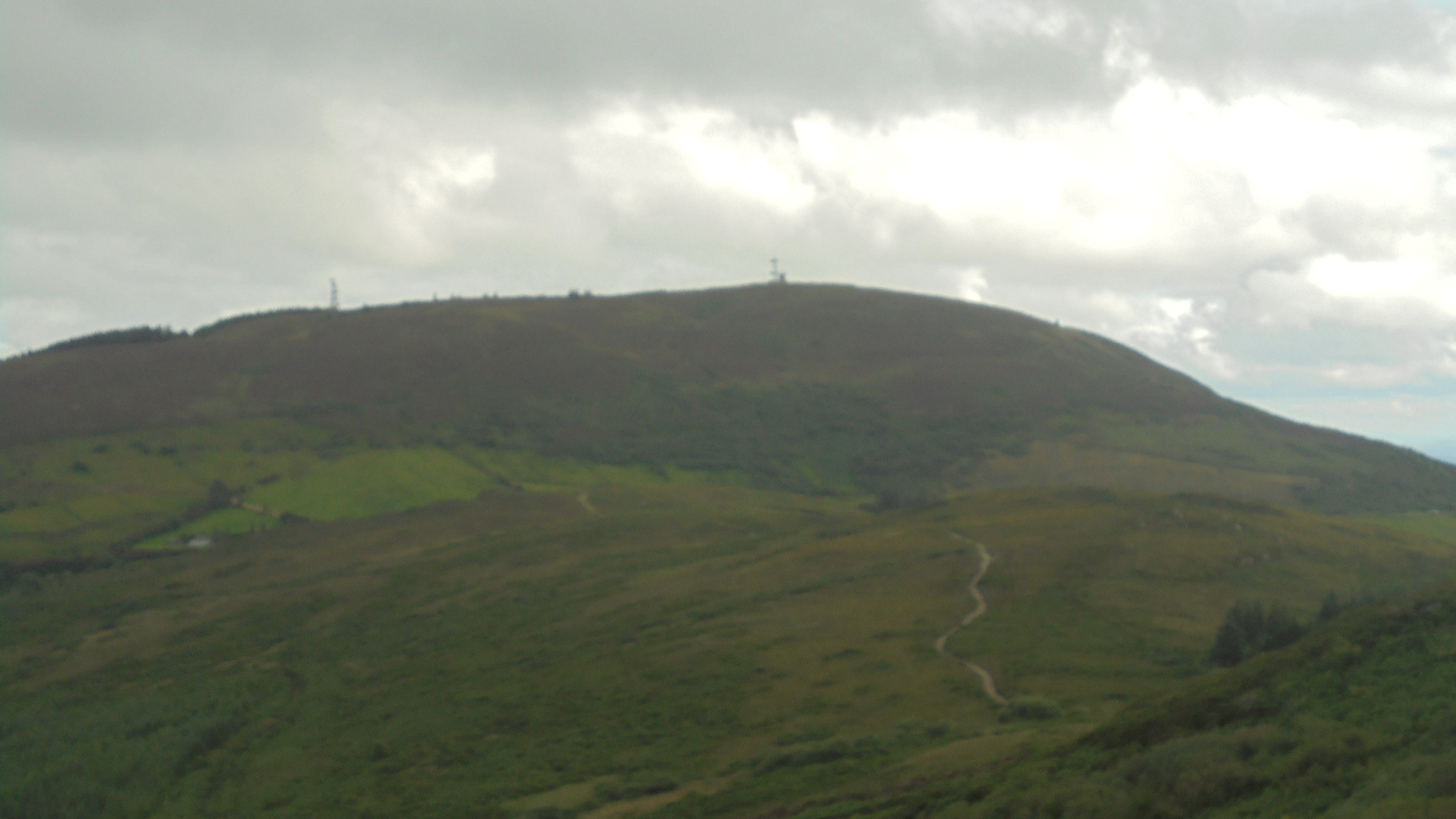
Tountinna on a cloudy day
