= List of towns and villages in County Tipperary =

List of towns and villages in a county of Ireland

This is a list of towns and villages in County Tipperary, Ireland.

== A ==
- Ahenny – Áth Eine
- Ardfinnan – Ard Fhíonáin

== B ==
- Ballina – Béal an Átha
- Ballingarry – Baile an Gharraí
- Ballyclerahan – Baile Uí Chléireacháin
- Ballylooby – Béal Átha Lúbaigh
- Ballyporeen – Béal Átha Póirín
- Bansha – An Bháinseach
- Birdhill – Cnocán an Éin Fhinn
- Borrisokane – Buiríos Uí Chéin
- Borrisoleigh – Buiríos Ó Luigheach

== C ==
- Cahir – An Chathair / Cathair Dún Iascaigh
- Cappawhite – An Cheapach na Bhfaoiteach
- Carrick-on-Suir – Carraig na Siúire
- Cashel – Caiseal
- Castleiney – Caisleán Aoibhne
- Clogheen – Chloichín an Mhargaid
- Cloneen – An Cluainín
- Clonmel – Cluain Meala
- Clonmore – An Cluain Mhór
- Clonoulty – Cluain Ultaigh
- Cloughjordan – Cloch Shiurdáin
- Coalbrook – Glaise na Ghuail
- Cullen – Cuilleann

== D ==
- Donohill – Dún Eochaille
- Drangan – Dun Drongan
- Drom – Drom
- Dromineer – Drom Inbhir
- Dualla – Dubhaille
- Dundrum – Dún Droma

== E ==
- Emly – Imleach Iubhair

== F ==
- Fethard – Fiodh Ard

== G ==
- Golden – An Gabhailín
- Gortnahoe – Gort na hUamha
- Grangemockler – Grainseach Mhocleir

== H ==
- Hollyford – Áth an Chuillinn
- Holycross – Mainistir na Croiche
- Horse and Jockey – An Marcach

== K ==
- Killenaule – Cill Náile
- Kilsheelan – Cill Siolain
- Killoscully - Cill Ó Scolaí
- Knockgraffon – Cnoc Rafann

== L ==
- Lisronagh – Lios Ruanach
- Littleton – An Baile Beag
- Lorrha – Lothra
- Loughmore – Luach Magh

== M ==
- Milestone – Cloch an Mhíle

== N ==
- Nenagh – An tAonach
- New Birmingham – Gleann an Ghuail
- New Inn – Loch Cheann
- Newport – An Tulach Sheasta
- Ninemilehouse – Tigh na Naoi Míle

== R ==
- Rearcross – Crois na Rae
- Roscrea – Ros Cré
- Rosegreen – Faiche Ró
- Rathcabbin – An Rath Cabbàn

== S ==
- Silvermines- Beal Atha Gabhann

== T ==
- Templemore – An Teampall Mór
- Thurles – Durlas
- Tipperary – Tiobraid Árann
- Toomevara – Tuaim Uí Mheára
- Two-Mile Borris – Buiríos Léith

== U ==
- Upperchurch – An Teampall Uachtarach
