= Fintan's Grave =

Mythological cave on the Irish mountain Tul Tuinde

- Fert Fintain, Dun Tulcha
- Location within Ireland
- Coordinates: 52°50′48″N 8°23′26″W
- Entrances: 1

Fintan's Grave is a mythological cave on the Irish mountain (now hill) Tul Tuinde (Hill of the Wave) in the Arra Mountains near Lough Derg.

Supposedly, Fintan mac Bóchra waited out the Flood here.
