= Nenagh River =

Tributary of the Shannon in County Tipperary, Ireland

Coordinates: 52°56′N 8°16′W

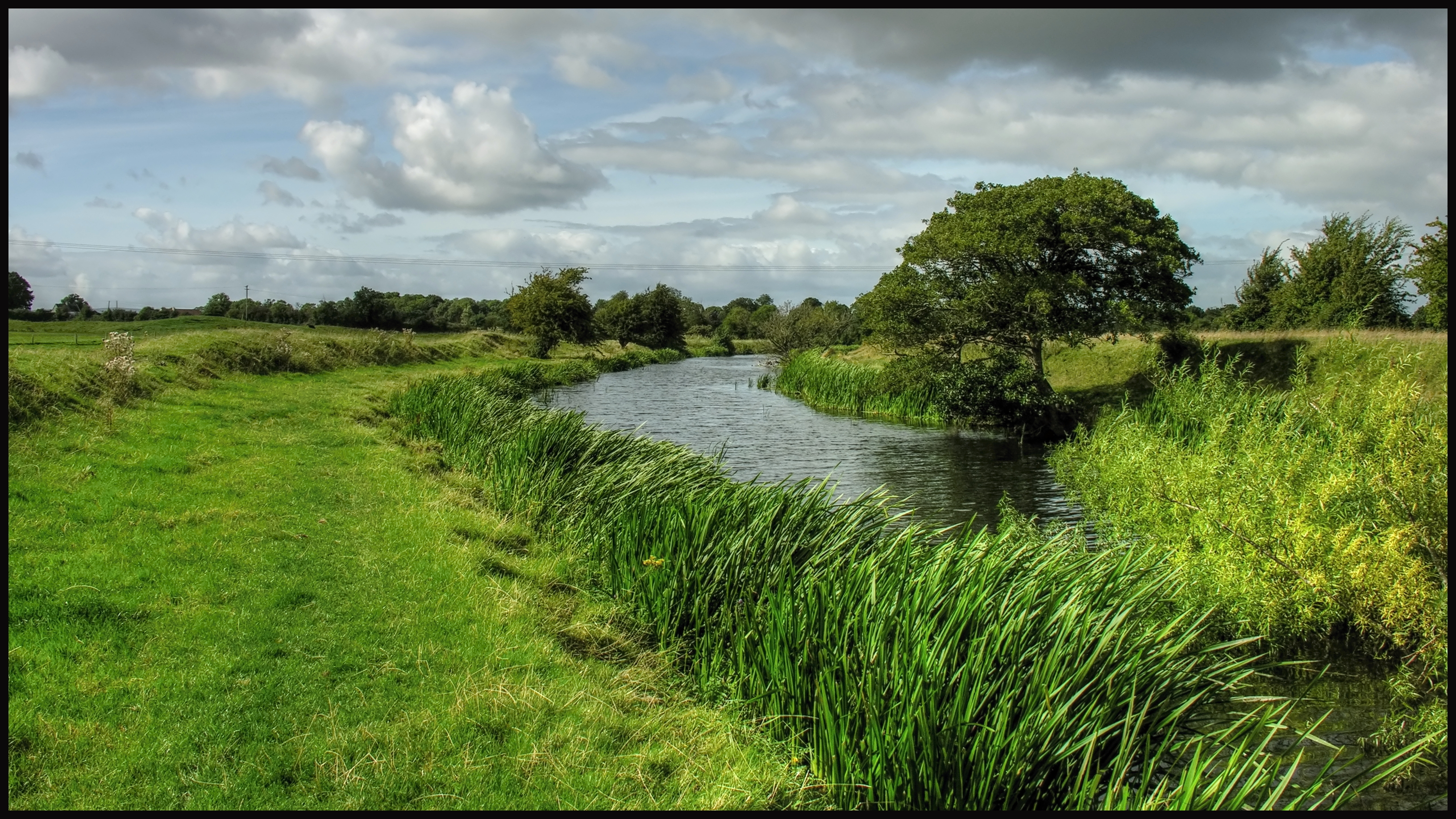
Nenagh River

The Nenagh River (Irish: An Ghaothach) rises in the Silvermine Mountains in County Tipperary, Ireland. It flows east of Nenagh and into Lough Derg just north of Dromineer.

== Recreation ==
The river, and its tributary the Ollatrim River, is popular for angling, it holds a stock of wild salmon and trout. There are also coarse fish particularly near the mouth of the river during spawning times. Funds were allocated to the Ormonde Anglers Association to improve areas for spawning and in-stream structures improving access, fencing, protecting banks and installing a number of deflectors. There is 22 kilometres (14 mi) of trout fishing and a further 15 kilometres (9.3 mi) on the Ollatrim. It is classified as a rich lowland river.

Slí Eala ("Way of the Swan") was a ten-kilometre (6.2 mi) waymarked trail which followed the banks of the Nenagh River from Dromineer via Ballyartella to Scott's Bridge, on the N52 road north of Nenagh. The walk took its name from the population of mute swans on the river. There were trailheads at Scott's Bridge and in Dromineer village.

== Bridges ==
There are several bridges over the river.

- Ballynaclogh bridge, built in about 1700, four arched limestone bridge with refuges for pedestrians. Widened in about 1750.
- Tyone Bridge (c. 1830) with three limestone arches carries the R498 road over the river just south of Nenagh town.
- Bennett's Bridge is a modern bridge carrying the R445 road, (previously the main Dublin to Limerick road) over the river at Lisbunny.
- Kyleeragh Bridge is a narrow bridge carrying the Nenagh-to-Birr road over the river just upstream of its confluence with the Ollatrim river.
- Scott's Bridge carries the N52 road over the river. This modern bridge replaced the Old Nenagh bridge, a limestone five arched bridge from about 1725 which is still in use by pedestrians.
- Vilabank bridge
- Ballyartella Bridge is a rubble limestone bridge built in about 1720 exhibiting the technical achievements of local craftsmen. The bridge was built with pedestrian refuges to allow traffic to pass freely.
- Annaghbeg Bridge is a seven-arched bridge from the mid-18th century. It is of limestone rubble with cut limestone features.
