= Tuan mac Cairill =

Figure in Irish mythology

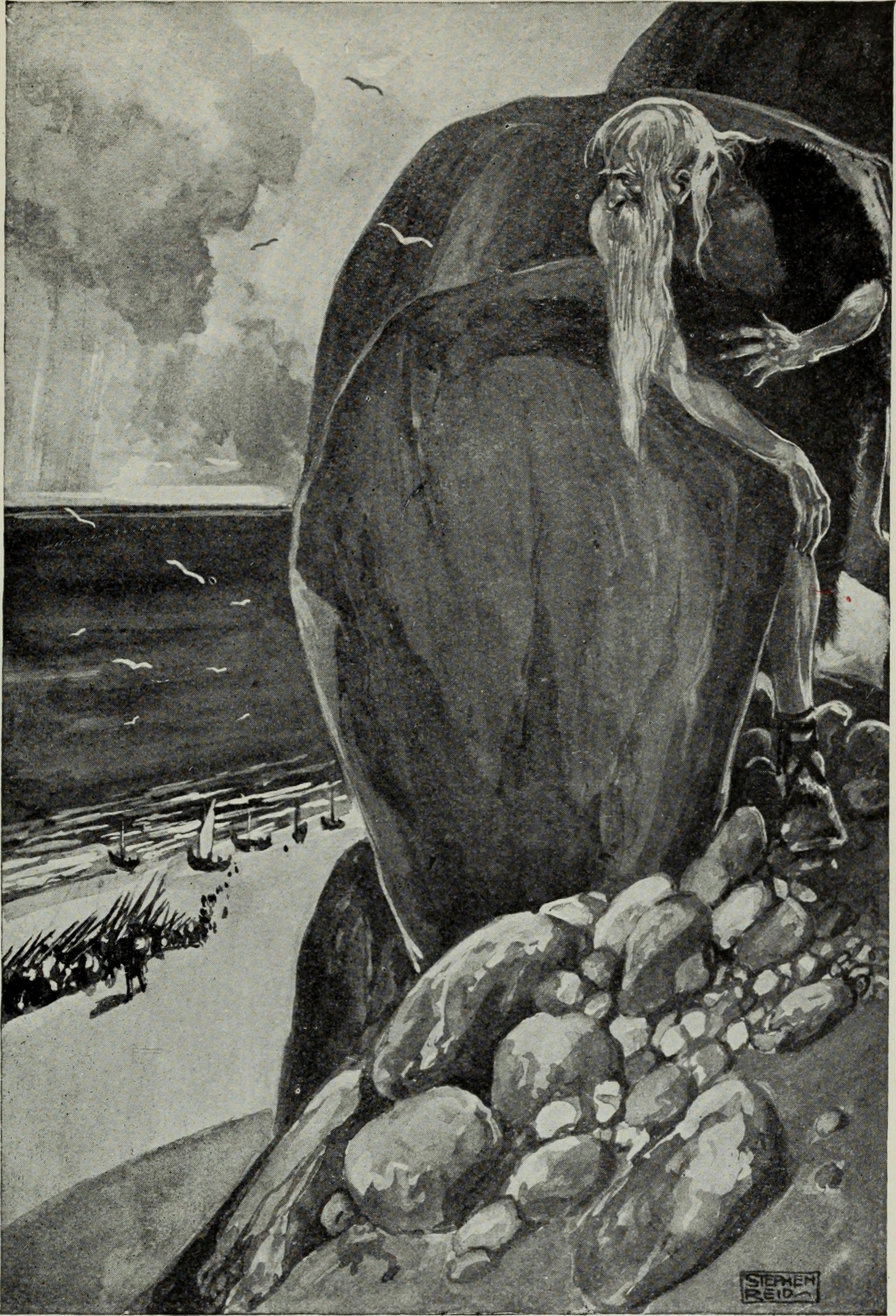
Tuan mac Cairill watches Nemed

In Irish mythology Tuan mac Cairill was a recluse who retains his memories from his previous incarnations, going back to Antediluvian age. Initially a follower of Partholon, he alone survived the plague, or the Flood, that killed the rest of his people. Through a series of animal transformations he survived into Christian times, and, in conversation with St. Finnian of Moville told a brief history of himself and of Ireland from his people onward to the coming of St. Patrick.

== Sources ==
His legend is found in an 11th-century manuscript called Lebor na hUidre (The Book of Dun Cow); in a 15th Century manuscript called Laud 610 kept at the Bodleian Library, Oxford; and in a 16th Century manuscript labeled H.3.18 at Trinity College, Dublin.

== Summary ==
Tuan who was a hermit or recluse, told St. Finnan that he was born 2000 years earlier and witnessed many of the waves of invaders who came to ancient Ireland - the Nemedians, Fir Bolg and the Tuatha De Dannan.

As the lone human guarding the land, he grew hairy, clawed and gray. And he witnessed the invasion of Nemed (who he says was his father's brother), and woke up one day to find himself reborn as a vigorous young stag. The ancient stag watched the Nemedians perish, and was again reborn into a young wild boar, and became the king of the boar-herds, witnessing the taking of Ireland by Semion, leader of the Fir Bolg. Then he became a great hawk (or eagle) and saw Ireland seized by the Tuatha Dé Danann and the Milesians. Later reincarnated into a salmon, he was caught by a fisherman serving a chieftain called Cairill, and was eaten whole by the Cairill's wife, and passed into her womb to be reborn as Tuan mac (son of) Cairill. He was eventually converted to Christianity, and conversed with St. Patrick and Colum Cille.

== In Children's Literature ==
The tale of Tuam Mac Cairill features as the opening narrative in James Stephens 1920 work Irish Fairy Tales.

== See also ==
- Lebor Gabála Érenn - compare with Tuan's shortened and truncated history of Ireland.
- Fintan mac Bóchra - a similar figure in Irish myth
