= Kilgarvan, County Tipperary =

Townland in County Tipperary, Ireland

Kilgarvan (Coill an Gharráin in Irish) is a townland in County Tipperary within the historical Barony of Ormond Lower, County Tipperary, Ireland. The townland is on the shores of Lough Derg.

== Kilgarvan Quay ==
When the River Shannon was a commercial thoroughfare Kilgarvan was a barley exporting station shipping to Banagher and Dublin. The quay is now a popular mooring for pleasure craft on the lough.
