= Tyone =

Townland in County Tipperary, Ireland

Tyone (Tigh Eoin in Irish) is a townland in the historical Barony of Ormond Upper, County Tipperary, Ireland.

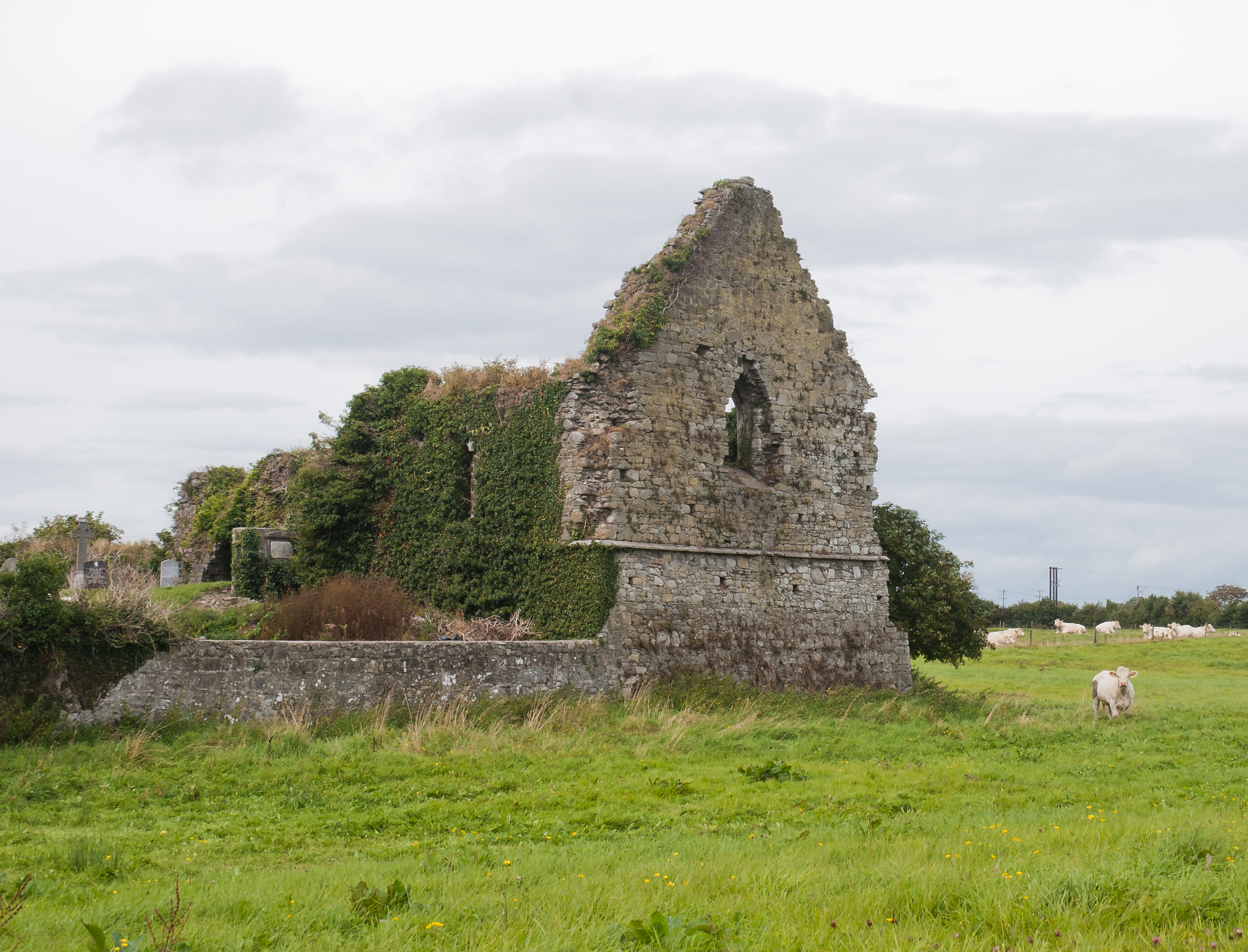
Remains of Tyone Priory

== Location ==
The townland is located on the banks of the Nenagh River to the south-west of Nenagh.

== Sport ==
Nenagh Ormond rugby football club have a secondary ground at Tyone.

== Buildings of note ==
Tyone Bridge (built c1830) is a limestone bridge with three arches. It is listed on the National Inventory of Architectural Heritage as being of special architectural and technical interest. It carries the R498 road over the Nenagh River.

The ruins of Tyone Priory are all that remain of a medieval hospital and priory dedicated to Saint John the Baptist.

St. Joseph's Hospital, formally the Nenagh Hospital, is within the townland. The hospital and adjoining mortuary church are built in the International Style.
