= Former titles of departments of state (Ireland) =

This is a list of former titles of departments of state in Ireland. The Ministers and Secretaries Act 1924 established eleven departments of state. The titles of two of these were amended by an Act in 1928, and an Act in 1939 allowed further changes to the titles and responsibilities of departments to be made by order of the government. The titles and responsibilities of departments are often changed by the government. In many instances, the legal successor of a department is not one which currently holds responsibilities for some or any of the same areas. Further departments were established by later amendments to the Ministers and Secretaries Act. The process of renaming of departments and transfer of responsibilities are detailed on the page for each department.

The titles of the Departments of Finance, Defence and Further and Higher Education, Research, Innovation and Science have not changed since their establishment.

Title	Period used	Immediate legal successor	Current departments with functions
Agriculture	1928–1965	Agriculture and Fisheries	Agriculture, Food and the Marine
Agriculture	1977–1987	Agriculture and Food	Agriculture, Food and the Marine
Agriculture and Fisheries	1965–1977	Agriculture	Agriculture, Food and the Marine
Agriculture and Food	1987–1993	Agriculture, Food and Forestry	Agriculture, Food and the Marine
Agriculture and Food	1997–1999	Agriculture, Food and Rural Development	Agriculture, Food and the Marine; Rural and Community Development
Agriculture and Food	2002–2007	Agriculture, Fisheries and Food	Agriculture, Food and the Marine
Agriculture, Fisheries and Food	2007–2011	Agriculture, Food and the Marine	Agriculture, Food and the Marine; Rural and Community Development
Agriculture, Food and Forestry	1993–1997	Agriculture and Food	Agriculture, Food and the Marine; Environment, Climate and Communications
Agriculture, Food and Rural Development	1999–2002	Agriculture and Food	Agriculture, Food and the Marine; Rural and Community Development
Arts, Culture and the Gaeltacht	1993–1997	Arts, Heritage, Gaeltacht and the Islands	Tourism, Culture, Arts, Gaeltacht, Sport and Media
Arts, Heritage and the Gaeltacht	2011–2016	Arts, Heritage, Regional, Rural and Gaeltacht Affairs	Tourism, Culture, Arts, Gaeltacht, Sport and Media; Housing, Local Government and Heritage
Arts, Heritage, Gaeltacht and the Islands	1997–2002	Community, Rural and Gaeltacht Affair	Tourism, Culture, Arts, Gaeltacht, Sport and Media; Rural and Community Development; Housing, Local Government and Heritage
Arts, Heritage, Regional, Rural and Gaeltacht Affairs	2016–2017	Culture, Heritage and the Gaeltacht	Tourism, Culture, Arts, Gaeltacht, Sport and Media; Rural and Community Development; Housing, Local Government and Heritage
Arts, Sport and Tourism	2002–2010	Tourism, Culture and Sport	Tourism, Culture, Arts, Gaeltacht, Sport and Media
Business, Enterprise and Innovation	2017–2020	Enterprise, Trade and Employment	Enterprise, Trade and Employment; Further and Higher Education, Research, Innovation and Science
Children and Youth Affairs	2011–2020	Children, Equality, Disability, Integration and Youth	Children, Disability and Equality
Children, Equality, Disability, Integration and Youth	2020–2025	Children, Disability and Equality	Children, Disability and Equality; Justice
Communications	1984–1991	Lapsed in 1991	Environment, Climate and Communications; Transport
Communications, Climate Action and Environment	2016–2020	Environment, Climate and Communications	Environment, Climate and Communications
Communications, Energy and Natural Resources	2007–2016	Communications, Climate Action and Environment	Environment, Climate and Communications
Communications, Marine and Natural Resources	2002–2007	Communications, Energy and Natural Resources	Agriculture, Food and the Marine; Environment, Climate and Communications
Community, Equality and Gaeltacht Affairs	2010–2011	Children and Youth Affairs	Tourism, Culture, Arts, Gaeltacht, Sport and Media; Rural and Community Development
Community, Rural and Gaeltacht Affairs	2002–2010	Community, Equality and Gaeltacht Affairs	Tourism, Culture, Arts, Gaeltacht, Sport and Media; Justice and Equality; Rural and Community Development
Culture, Heritage and the Gaeltacht	2017–2020	Tourism, Culture, Arts, Gaeltacht, Sport and Media	Tourism, Culture, Arts, Gaeltacht, Sport and Media; Housing, Local Government and Heritage
Economic Planning and Development	1977–1980	Energy	Finance
Education	1924–1997	Education and Science	Education
Education and Science	1997–2010	Education and Skills	Education
Education and Skills	2010–2020	Education	Education
Employment Affairs and Social Protection	2017–2020	Social Protection	Social Protection
Energy	1980–1981	Industry and Energy	Environment, Climate and Communications
Energy	1983–1993	Tourism and Trade	Environment, Climate and Communications
Enterprise and Employment	1993–1997	Enterprise, Trade and Employment	Enterprise, Trade and Employment; Social Protection
Enterprise, Trade and Employment	1997–2010	Enterprise, Trade and Innovation	Enterprise, Trade and Employment; Social Protection; Foreign Affairs
Enterprise, Trade and Innovation	2010–2011	Jobs, Enterprise and Innovation	Enterprise, Trade and Employment; Social Protection; Foreign Affairs
Environment	1977–1997	Environment and Local Government	Environment, Climate and Communications; Housing, Local Government and Heritage
Environment and Local Government	1997–2003	Environment, Heritage and Local Government	Environment, Climate and Communications; Housing, Local Government and Heritage
Environment, Heritage and Local Government	2003–2011	Environment, Community and Local Government	Environment, Climate and Communications; Tourism, Culture, Arts, Gaeltacht, Sport and Media; Housing, Local Government and Heritage
Environment, Community and Local Government	2011–2016	Housing, Planning, Community and Local Government	Environment, Climate and Communications; Housing, Local Government and Heritage; Rural and Community Development
Equality and Law Reform	1993–1997	Lapsed in 1997	Children, Equality, Disability, Integration and Youth; Justice
External Affairs	1924–1971	Foreign Affairs	Foreign Affairs
Foreign Affairs and Trade	2011–2020	Foreign Affairs	Enterprise, Trade and Employment; Foreign Affairs
Fisheries	1924–1928	Lands and Fisheries	Agriculture, Food and the Marine
Fisheries	1977–1978	Fisheries and Forestry	Agriculture, Food and the Marine
Fisheries and Forestry	1978–1986	Tourism, Fisheries and Forestry	Agriculture, Food and the Marine; Environment, Climate and Communications
Gaeltacht	1956–1993	Arts, Culture and the Gaeltacht	Tourism, Culture, Arts, Gaeltacht, Sport and Media
Health and Children	1997–2011	Health	Health; Children, Equality, Disability, Integration and Youth
Housing, Planning, Community and Local Government	2016–2017	Housing, Planning and Local Government	Housing, Local Government and Heritage; Rural and Community Development
Housing, Planning and Local Government	2017–2020	Housing, Local Government and Heritage	Housing, Local Government and Heritage
Industry and Commerce	1924–1977	Industry, Commerce and Energy	Enterprise, Trade and Employment; Environment, Climate and Communications
Industry and Commerce	1986–1993	Enterprise and Employment	Enterprise, Trade and Employment
Industry, Commerce and Energy	1977–1980	Industry, Commerce and Tourism	Enterprise, Trade and Employment; Environment, Climate and Communications
Industry, Commerce and Tourism	1980–1981	Trade, Commerce and Tourism	Enterprise, Trade and EmploymentTourism, Culture, Arts, Gaeltacht, Sport and Media
Industry and Energy	1981–1983	Tourism, Culture, Arts, Gaeltacht, Sport and Media	Enterprise, Trade and Employment; Environment, Climate and Communications
Industry, Trade, Commerce and Tourism	1983–1986	Industry and Commerce	Enterprise, Trade and Employment; Foreign Affairs; Tourism, Culture, Arts, Gaeltacht, Sport and Media
Jobs, Enterprise, and Innovation	2011–2017	Business, Enterprise and Innovation	Enterprise, Trade and Employment; Further and Higher Education, Research, Innovation and Science
Justice, Equality and Law Reform	1997–2010	Justice and Law Reform	Justice
Justice and Law Reform	2010–2011	Justice and Equality	Justice
Justice and Equality	2011–2020	Justice	Justice; Children, Equality, Disability, Integration and Youth
Labour	1966–1993	Equality and Law Reform	Enterprise, Trade and Employment
Lands and Agriculture	1924–1928	Agriculture	Agriculture, Food and the Marine
Lands and Fisheries	1928–1934	Lands	Agriculture, Food and the Marine; Environment, Climate and Communications
Lands	1934–1977	Fisheries	Environment, Climate and Communications
Local Government	1947–1977	Environment	Housing, Local Government and Heritage
Local Government and Public Health	1924–1947	Local Government	Health; Housing, Local Government and Heritage
Marine	1987–1997	Marine and Natural Resources	Agriculture, Food and the Marine
Marine and Natural Resources	1997–2002	Communications, Marine and Natural Resources	Agriculture, Food and the Marine; Environment, Climate and Communications
Posts and Telegraphs	1924–1984	Abolished in 1984	Environment, Climate and Communications
President of the Executive Council	1924–1937	Taoiseach	Taoiseach
Public Enterprise	1997–2002	Transport	Environment, Climate and Communications; Transport
Public Expenditure and Reform	2011–2023	Public Expenditure, National Development Plan Delivery and Reform	Public Expenditure, National Development Plan Delivery and Reform
Public Service	1973–1987	Transport	Finance
Social and Family Affairs	2002–2010	Social Protection	Children, Equality, Disability, Integration and Youth; Social Protection
Social, Community and Family Affairs	1997–2002	Social and Family Affairs	Children, Equality, Disability, Integration and Youth; Social Protection; Rural and Community Development
Social Welfare	1947–1997	Social, Community and Family Affairs	Social Protection
Supplies	1939–1945	Abolished in 1945	Enterprise, Trade and Employment
Trade, Commerce and Tourism	1981–1983	Industry, Trade, Commerce and Tourism	Enterprise, Trade and Employment; Tourism, Culture, Arts, Gaeltacht, Sport and Media
Transport	1980–1984	Abolished in 1984	Transport
Transport and Power	1959–1977	Tourism and Transport	Environment, Climate and Communications; Transport
Tourism and Trade	1993–1997	Tourism, Sport and Recreation	Enterprise, Trade and Employment; Tourism, Culture, Arts, Gaeltacht, Sport and Media
Tourism, Culture and Sport	2010–2011	Arts, Heritage and the Gaeltacht	Tourism, Culture, Arts, Gaeltacht, Sport and Media; Transport
Tourism, Fisheries and Forestry	1986–1987	Marine	Agriculture, Food and the Marine; Environment, Climate and Communications; Tourism, Culture, Arts, Gaeltacht, Sport and Media
Tourism and Transport	1977–1980	Transport	Tourism, Culture, Arts, Gaeltacht, Sport and Media; Transport
Tourism and Transport	1987–1991	Transport, Transport and Communications	Tourism, Culture, Arts, Gaeltacht, Sport and Media; Transport
Tourism, Sport and Recreation	1997–2002	Arts, Sport and Tourism	Tourism, Culture, Arts, Gaeltacht, Sport and Media
Tourism, Tourism and Sport	2011–2020	Transport	Tourism, Culture, Arts, Gaeltacht, Sport and Media; Transport
Tourism, Transport and Communications	1991–1993	Transport, Energy and Communications	Environment, Climate and Communications; Tourism, Culture, Arts, Gaeltacht, Sport and Media; Transport
Transport, Energy and Communications	1993–1997	Public Enterprise	Environment, Climate and Communications; Transport
