= Department of Rural and Community Development and the Gaeltacht =

Irish government department

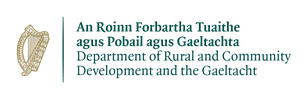

Department overview
- Formed: 19 July 2017
- Jurisdiction: Government of Ireland
- Headquarters: Leinster Street South, Dublin
- Minister responsible: Dara Calleary, Minister for Rural and Community Development and the Gaeltacht
- Department executive: Mary Hurley, Secretary General
- Website: Official website

The Department of Rural and Community Development and the Gaeltacht (Irish: An Roinn Forbartha Tuaithe agus Pobail agus Gaeltachta) is a department of the Government of Ireland. It is led by the Minister for Rural and Community Development and the Gaeltacht.

== Departmental team ==
The headquarters and ministerial offices of the department are on Leinster Street South, Dublin. The departmental team consists of the following:

- Minister for Rural and Community Development and the Gaeltacht: Dara Calleary, TD
  - Minister of State at the Department of Rural and Community Development and the Gaeltacht with special responsibility for community development, charities, Gaeltacht and the islands: Jerry Buttimer, TD. Buttimer is also a Minister of State at the Department of Transport.
- Secretary General of the Department: Mary Hurley

== Structure ==
The department has the following divisions:

- Corporate Affairs and Strategic Development
- Community Development
- Rural Development and Regional Affairs
- Gaeltacht and Irish Language

== Aegis bodies ==
The following bodies are under the aegis of the department:

- Western Development Commission
- Údarás na Gaeltachta
- Foras na Gaeilge
- Ulster-Scots Agency
- An Coimisinéir Teanga
- Pobal
- Water Safety Ireland
- Charities Regulator

== Schemes ==
Rural: Town and Village Renewal scheme, Rural Recreation Infrastructure Scheme, Rural Walks Scheme, Rural Development Fund, CLÁR, LEADER programme, Tidy Towns competition, Dormant Accounts Fund (also supporting disadvantaged urban communities).

Community: Social Inclusion and Community Programme, Community Facilities Scheme, Revitalising Areas by Planning, Investment and Development (RAPID) Programme, Libraries Investment Programme, Seniors Alert Scheme, Community and Voluntary Supports Programme, National Organisations Supports Programme, PEACE Programme.

== History ==
The Department of Rural and Community Development was created by the Ministers and Secretaries (Amendment) Act 2017 as part of the reorganisation of governmental departments in the government of Leo Varadkar. The divisions had previously existed within the same department between 2002 and 2010 in the Department of Community, Rural and Gaeltacht Affairs.

=== Transfer of functions ===
Date	Change
19 July 2017	Establishment of the Department of Rural and Community Development
26 July 2017	Transfer of Charities from the Department of Justice and Equality
27 July 2017	Transfer of Rural Affairs from the Department of Arts, Heritage, Regional, Rural and Gaeltacht Affairs
27 July 2017	Transfer of Community Development from the Department of Housing, Planning, Community and Local Government
1 January 2018	Transfer of Community Services Programme from the Department of Employment Affairs and Social Protection
1 June 2018	Transfer of Water Safety from the Department of Housing, Planning and Local Government
23 September 2020	Transfer of Islands from the Department of Culture, Heritage and the Gaeltacht
1 June 2025	Transfer of Irish Language and the Gaeltacht from the Department of Tourism, Culture, Arts, Gaeltacht, Sport and Media
1 June 2025	Transfer of Dog control to the Department of Agriculture, Food and the Marine
2 June 2025	Renamed as the Department of Rural and Community Development and the Gaeltacht
