= Ballycommon =

Village in County Tipperary

Ballycommon Baile Uí Chomáin
- Village
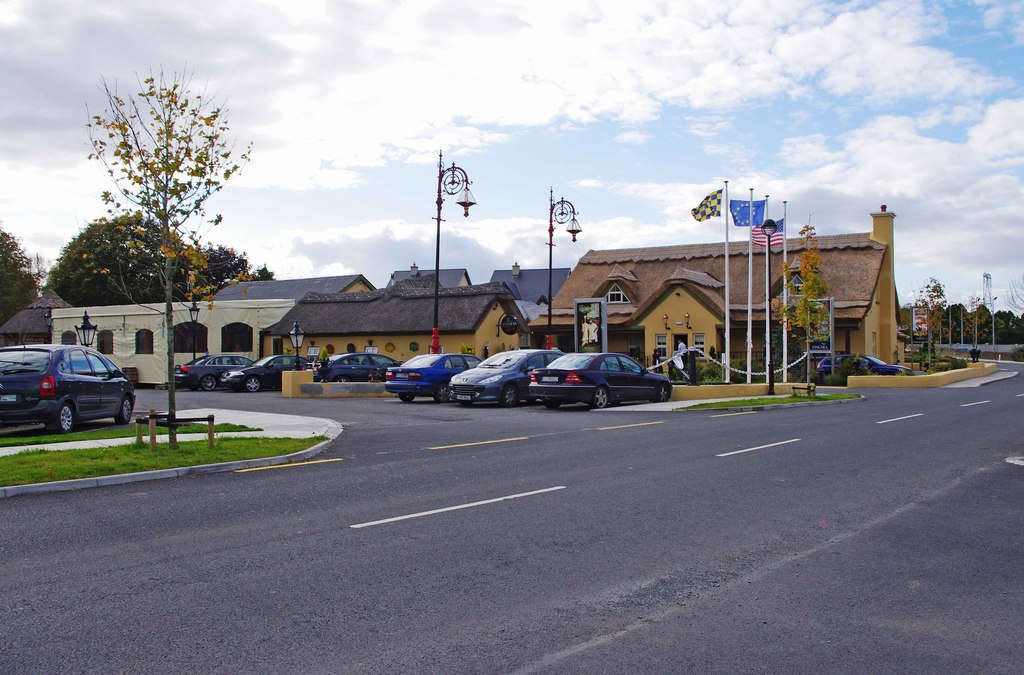
- Thatched Cottage pub, Ballycommon

- Location in Ireland
- Coordinates: 52°53′30″N 8°14′41″W
- Country: Ireland
- Province: Munster
- County: County Tipperary
- Time zone: UTC+0 (WET)
  - Summer (DST): UTC-1 (IST (WEST))

Ballycommon (Irish: Baile Uí Chomáin) is a village and townland in County Tipperary, Ireland. Around 5 km along the R495 road north-west of Nenagh, it is in the barony of Ormond Lower and part of the parish of Puckane in the Roman Catholic Diocese of Killaloe.

Kildangan GAA is the local Gaelic Athletic Association club. It is not to be confused with the district and GAA team in County Offaly called Ballycommon, 5 miles east of Tullamore.

Carrig National School is a co-educational school situated on top of Carrig Hill, adjacent to St. Mary's Church. The original school was built in 1914 and currently there are 217 students enrolled.
