= Government of Ireland =

- Irish: Rialtas na hÉireann
- Central government

Overview
- Established: 29 December 1937
- Country: (Republic of Ireland) Ireland
- Polity: Unitary parliamentary republic
- Leader: Taoiseach
- Appointed by: President of Ireland on successful nomination from Dáil Éireann
- Ministries: 18 (list)
- Responsible to: Oireachtas Éireann
- Annual budget: €117.8 billion (2026)
- Headquarters: Government Buildings, Merrion Street, Dublin
- Website: www.gov.ie/en/ www.ireland.ie/en/

The Government of Ireland (Irish: Rialtas na hÉireann) is the executive authority of Ireland, headed by the taoiseach, the head of government. The government – also known as the cabinet – is composed of ministers, each of whom must be a member of the Oireachtas, which consists of Dáil Éireann and Seanad Éireann. Ministers are usually assigned a government department with a portfolio covering specific policy areas although provision exists for the appointment of a minister without portfolio.

The taoiseach must be nominated by the Dáil, the House of Representatives, from among its members. Following the nomination of the Dáil, the president of Ireland formally appoints the taoiseach. The president also appoints members of the government on the nomination of the taoiseach and their approval by the Dáil. The taoiseach nominates one member of the government as tánaiste, the deputy head of government. Like the taoiseach, the tánaiste and the minister for finance must be members of the Dáil.

The government is dependent on the Oireachtas to pass primary legislation and as such, the government needs to command a majority in the Dáil to ensure support and confidence for budgets and the passage of government legislation.

The 35th government of Ireland entered office on 23 January 2025 with Micheál Martin, leader of Fianna Fáil, as Taoiseach, and Simon Harris, leader of Fine Gael, as Tánaiste. It is a coalition government of Fianna Fáil, Fine Gael and a group of independent TDs, and was formed after negotiations following a general election in December 2024.

== Government ==
Membership of the cabinet is regulated by Article 28 of the Constitution of Ireland and by the Ministers and Secretaries Acts 1924 to 2020. The Constitution requires the government to consist of between seven and fifteen members, all of whom must be a member of the Oireachtas.

Since the formation of the 12th government of Ireland in 1966, all Irish cabinets have been formed with the constitutional maximum of fifteen ministers. The total sometimes falls below this number for brief periods following the resignation of individual ministers or the withdrawal of a party from a coalition.

No more than two members of the cabinet may be members of Seanad Éireann. All other members of the cabinet must be members of Dáil Éireann, the house of representatives. The Taoiseach, Tánaiste and Minister for Finance must be members of the Dáil. In practice, however, the members of the cabinet are invariably members of the Dáil. Since the adoption of the 1937 Constitution, only two ministers have been appointed from the Seanad: Seán Moylan who served in 1957 as Minister for Agriculture and James Dooge who served as Minister for Foreign Affairs from 1981 to 1982. Joseph Connolly, a member of the Free State Seanad, had served in the Executive Council of the Irish Free State from 1932 to 1933 as Minister for Posts and Telegraphs, and from 1933 to 1936 as Minister for Lands and Fisheries.

A member of the government in charge of a Department of state is designated a minister of the Government (before 1977 this position was termed Minister of State). For distinction, Ministers of State (known before 1977 as Parliamentary Secretaries) – informally called junior ministers – are not Ministers of the Government, but assist those ministers in their departments. A minister without portfolio may be appointed to the Government who is not the head of a Department of state; this occurred during the period known in Ireland as the Emergency when Frank Aiken served as Minister for the Co-ordination of Defensive Measures from 1939 until 1945. The functions of government ministers are frequently transferred between departments during cabinet reshuffles or after elections. On occasion, a department of state will cease to exist, its functions being transferred to another department. Such defunct ministerial positions include the Ministers for Labour, Posts and Telegraphs, Public Service and Supplies.

== Non-members attending cabinet ==
Non-members have no voting rights at cabinet but may otherwise participate fully, and normally receive circulated cabinet papers on the same basis as a full member of government. Votes are rare, however, with the cabinet usually following the Taoiseach or working by consensus.

The government is advised by the Attorney General, who is not a member of the government, but who participates in cabinet meetings as part of their role as legal advisor to the government.

The Chief Whip may attend meetings of the cabinet, but is not a member of the government. In addition, the government can select other Ministers of State who may attend cabinet meetings. Up to three Ministers of State who regularly attend cabinet meetings may receive an allowance. This person is informally known as a "super junior minister". Ministers of state attending cabinet in the 35th government are Mary Butler, Hildegarde Naughton, Noel Grealish, and Seán Canney. Trinity College Dublin law professor Oran Doyle has argued that this practice breaches cabinet confidentiality as required by the Constitution. In January 2025, opposition TDs Pa Daly and Paul Murphy challenged the attendance of ministers of state at cabinet.

== Term of office ==
A new government is formed by the taoiseach appointed after each general election after receiving the nomination of the Dáil. All members of the government are deemed to have resigned on the resignation of the taoiseach. Therefore, a new government is appointed where there is a new taoiseach within a single Dáil term. The Constitution allows a Dáil term of no more than seven years, but a shorter period may be specified by law; this has been set as a maximum of five years. The taoiseach may at any time advise the president to dissolve the Dáil, prompting a new general election.

The taoiseach must retain the confidence of Dáil Éireann to remain in office. If the taoiseach ceases "to retain the support of a majority in Dáil Éireann", the taoiseach must resign unless they seek a dissolution of the Dáil which is granted by the president. This applies only in cases of a motion of no confidence or loss of supply (rejection of a budget), rather than the defeat of the government in other legislation or Dáil votes. The president retains absolute discretion to refuse to grant a dissolution to a taoiseach who has lost the confidence of the Dáil. To date, no President has refused the request of a Taoiseach to dissolve the Dáil.

The taoiseach can direct the president to dismiss or accept the resignation of individual ministers. When the taoiseach resigns, the entire government is deemed to have resigned as a collective. However, in such a scenario, according to the Constitution, "the Taoiseach and the other members of the government shall continue to carry on their duties until their successors shall have been appointed".

On the dissolution of Dáil Éireann, ministers who were TDs cease to be members of the Oireachtas. However, the Constitution also provides that "the members of the Government in the office at the date of a dissolution of Dáil Éireann shall continue to hold office until their successors shall have been appointed".

== Caretaker Government ==
Where the resignation of the taoiseach and government is not immediately followed by the appointment by the president of a new taoiseach on the nomination of the Dáil, the outgoing government continues as a caretaker government to "carry out their duties until their successors have been appointed". This has happened when no candidate was nominated for taoiseach when the Dáil first assembled after a general election, or, on one occasion, where a taoiseach had lost the confidence of the Dáil, but there was not a dissolution of the Dáil followed by a general election.

Date of resignation	Taoiseach	Caretaker government	Date of new government	Taoiseach	Incoming government
26 June 1989	Charles Haughey	Fianna Fáil	12 July 1989	Charles Haughey	Fianna Fáil–Progressive Democrats
14 December 1992	Albert Reynolds	Fianna Fáil	12 January 1993	Albert Reynolds	Fianna Fáil–Labour
18 November 1994	Albert Reynolds	Fianna Fáil	15 December 1994	John Bruton	Fine Gael–Labour–Democratic Left
10 March 2016	Enda Kenny	Fine Gael–Labour	6 May 2016	Enda Kenny	Fine Gael–Independent
20 February 2020	Leo Varadkar	Fine Gael–Independent	27 June 2020	Micheál Martin	Fianna Fáil–Fine Gael–Green Party

== Authority and powers ==
The government of Ireland is both the de jure and de facto executive authority in Ireland. This is in contrast to some other parliamentary regimes, where the head of state is the nominal chief executive, though bound by convention to act on the advice of the cabinet. In Ireland, however, the Constitution explicitly vests executive authority in the government, not the president.

The executive authority of the government is subject to certain limitations. In particular:

- The state may not declare war, or participate in a war, without the consent of the Dáil. In the case of "actual invasion", however, "the Government may take whatever steps they may consider necessary for the protection of the State".

Government ministers are collectively responsible for the actions of the government. Each minister is responsible for the actions of his or her department. Departments of State do not have legal personalities. Actions of departments are carried out under the title of ministers even, as is commonly the case when the minister has little knowledge of the details of these actions. This contradicts the rule in common law that a person given a statutory power cannot delegate that power. This leads to a phrase in correspondence by government departments, "the Minister has directed me to write", on letters or documents that the minister in question may never have seen.

If the government, or any member of the government, should fail to fulfil its constitutional duties, it may be ordered to do so by a court of law, by a writ of mandamus. Ministers who fail to comply may, ultimately, be found to be in contempt of court, and even imprisoned.

Only the Government has the constitutional authority to seek the approval of Dáil Éireann for the spending of any revenues of the State. This gives the Government sole control over public spending in Ireland. Article 11 of the Constitution established the Central Fund, it states: "All revenues of the State from whatever source arising shall, subject to such exception as may be provided by law, form one fund, and shall be appropriated for the purposes and in the manner and subject to the charges and liabilities determined and imposed by law."

Any charges or spending from the Central Fund must be approved by a vote in Dáil Éireann. Article 17, subsection 2 of the Constitution states: "Dáil Éireann shall not pass any vote or resolution, and no law shall be enacted, for the appropriation of revenue or other public moneys unless the purpose of the appropriation shall have been recommended to Dáil Éireann by a message from the Government signed by the Taoiseach." This ensures that no law which requires the spending of public funds can be enacted by the Oireachtas without the prior consent of the Government.

== History ==
Prior to independence, the executive of the unilaterally declared Irish Republic was the Ministry of Dáil Éireann. This was in operation from 1919 to 1922. After the approval of the Anglo-Irish Treaty in January 1922, a Provisional Government of Ireland was established as the executive. The personnel of the Provisional Government overlapped with the Ministry of Dáil Éireann, but they were not identical. On the independence of the Irish Free State on 6 December 1922, both executives were succeeded by the Executive Council of the Irish Free State. On 29 December 1937, on the coming into force of the Constitution of Ireland, the Eighth Executive Council of the Irish Free State became the First Government of Ireland.

The detail and structure of the Government of Ireland has its legislative basis in the Ministers and Secretaries Act 1924; it has been amended on a number of occasions, and these may be cited together as the Ministers and Secretaries Acts 1924 to 2020 and are construed together as one Act.

All governments from 1989 to 2016 were coalitions of two or more parties. The first coalition government was formed in 1948. The Taoiseach has almost always been the leader of the largest party in the coalition, with the exceptions of John A. Costello, Taoiseach from 1948 to 1951 and from 1954 to 1957 (a member of Fine Gael but not the party leader) and Leo Varadkar, from 2022 to 2024, and Simon Harris, from 2024 to 2025 (leaders of Fine Gael, in a three-party coalition where Fianna Fáil was the largest party).

== Public service ==
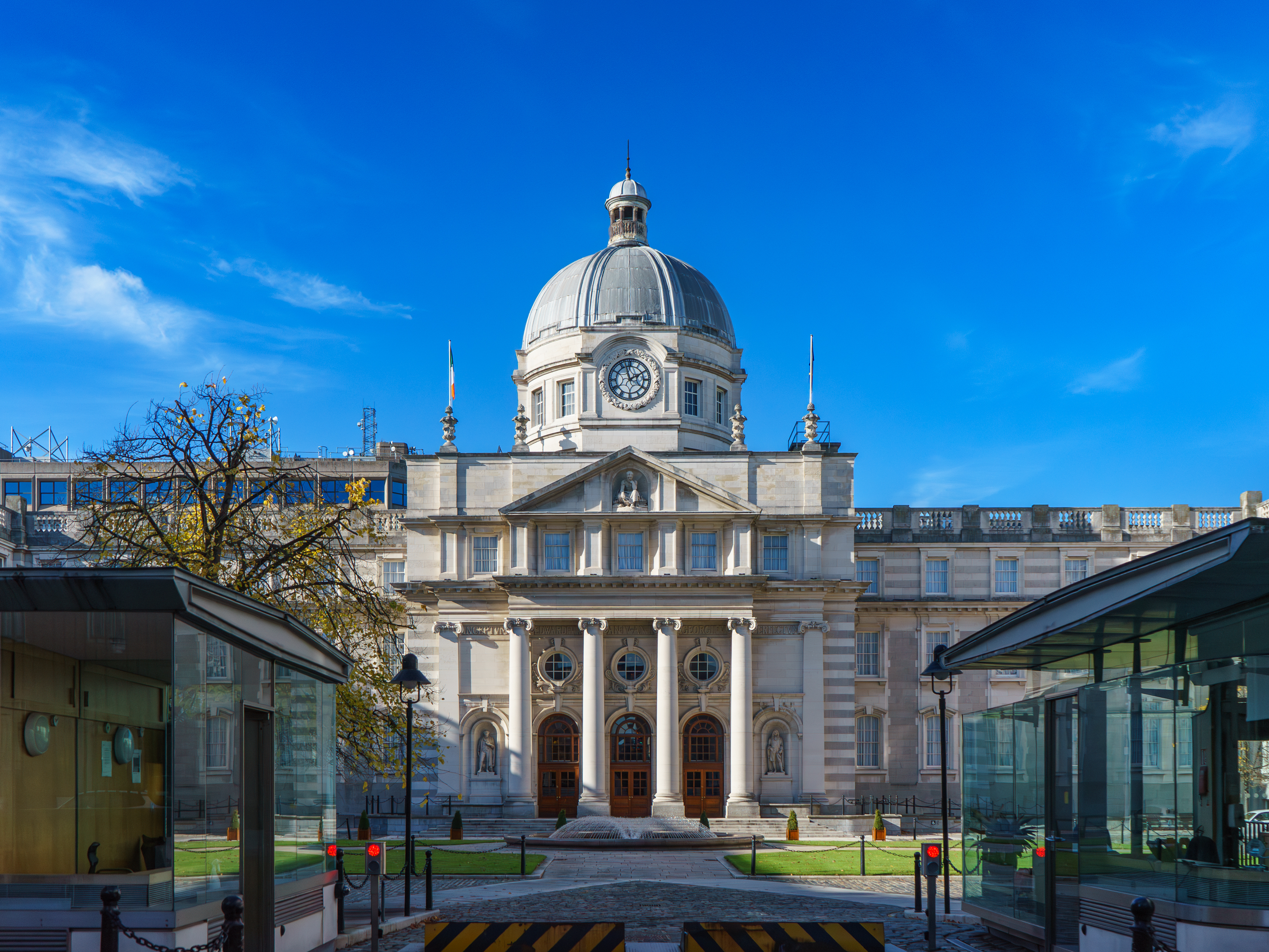
Government Buildings in Dublin.

The public service in Ireland refers to the totality of public administration in Ireland. As of Q4, 2024 the total number of employees in the Irish public service stands at 408,895 people. The Department of Public Expenditure, Infrastructure, Public Service Reform and Digitalisation defines the public service as comprising seven sectors: the civil service, defence sector, education sector, health sector, justice sector, local authorities and non-commercial state agencies (such as Bord Bia, IDA Ireland and the Commission for Regulation of Utilities). Commercial state-owned bodies such as RTÉ, ESB Group and An Post are not part of the public service in Ireland.

The largest sector is the health sector with over 148,265 employees (largely in the Health Service Executive), followed by the education sector with approximately 134,556.

=== Public service employees ===
Sector	Employees
Civil Service	52,793
Defence Sector	7,903
Education Sector	134,556
Health Sector	148,265
Justice Sector	14,080
Local Authorities	32,372
NCSA	18,922
Total	408,895

=== Largest single public sector bodies by employees ===
Agency/Body	Employees
Health Service Executive	89,284
Garda Síochána	14,080
Irish Defence Forces	7,903
Revenue Commissioners	6,622
Dublin City Council	6,094
Irish Prison Service	3,547

=== Civil service ===
The civil service of Ireland consists of two broad components, the Civil Service of the Government and the Civil Service of the State. While this partition is largely theoretical, the two parts do have some fundamental operational differences. The civil service is expected to maintain political impartiality in its work, and some parts of it are entirely independent of government decision-making.

== Current government of Ireland ==
Micheál Martin was nominated as Taoiseach by Dáil Éireann on 23 January 2025 and appointed by the president. Martin nominated the government members, and after their approval by the Dáil, they were appointed by the president.

Government ministers
Office	Name	Party
Taoiseach	Micheál Martin	Fianna Fáil
Tánaiste; Minister for Finance	Simon Harris	Fine Gael
Minister for Enterprise, Tourism and Employment; Minister for Culture, Communications and Sport	Peter Burke	Fine Gael
Minister for Health	Jennifer Carroll Macneill	Fine Gael
Minister for Foreign Affairs and Trade; Minister for Defence	Helen McEntee	Fine Gael
Minister for Public Expenditure, Infrastructure, Public Service Reform and Digitalisation	Jack Chambers	Fianna Fáil
Minister for Climate, Energy and the Environment; Minister for Transport	Darragh O'Brien	Fianna Fáil
Minister for Housing, Local Government and Heritage	James Browne	Fianna Fáil
Minister for Agriculture, Food and the Marine	Martin Heydon	Fine Gael
Minister without portfolio	Patrick O'Donovan	Fine Gael
Minister for Further and Higher Education, Research, Innovation and Science	James Lawless	Fianna Fáil
Minister for Social Protection; Minister for Rural and Community Development and the Gaeltacht	Dara Calleary	Fianna Fáil
Minister for Children, Disability and Equality	Norma Foley	Fianna Fáil
Minister for Justice, Home Affairs and Migration	Jim O'Callaghan	Fianna Fáil
Minister for Education and Youth	Hildegarde Naughton	Fine Gael
Also attending cabinet
Government Chief Whip; Minister of State at the Department of Health	Mary Butler	Fianna Fáil
Minister of State at the Department of Agriculture, Food, Fisheries and the Marine	Noel Grealish	Independent
Minister of State at the Department of Transport	Seán Canney	Independent

== See also ==
- Irish cabinets since 1919
- Politics of the Republic of Ireland
