= Walks Scheme =

Scheme to support walking trails in Ireland

The Walks Scheme (previously known as the Comhairle na Tuaithe/Rural Walks Scheme) is an initiative by the Irish Department of Rural and Community Development and the Gaeltacht which funds the maintenance of walks and trails through private and public lands. The scheme has been in existence since 2008.

== Expansions ==
=== 2024 ===
Following a call for applications in June 2023, an expanded list of walks in the scheme were announced in February 2024, including the first walks in counties Wexford and Monaghan, and trails on off-shore islands Inis Meáin and Cape Clear Island.

=== 2025 ===
22 new walks across 10 counties were announced in May 2025. These included the "Siúlóid an tSáis" loop from Brandon Point, County Kerry, Fowley's Fall in Rossinver, and both the Keenagh Loop and Newport Coastal Trail in County Mayo.

== Walks ==
This is a list of notable walks included in the scheme.

- Monaghan Way
- Lúb Dún Fearbhaí, Inis Meáin
- The Devils Chimney, County Sligo
- Lough Derg Way
- Ardmore Cliff Walk, County Waterford
- Ladysbridge Loop Trail
- Durrow, County Laois#Amenities
- Mount Nebo
- Enniscorthy Promenade
- Lung Lough Gara Way
- Miners Way and Historical Trail, County Roscommon
- Cavan Way
- Mount Melleray pilgrim paths
- Keeldra Lake, County Leitrim
