= Killaloe Bridge =

Road bridge in Ireland

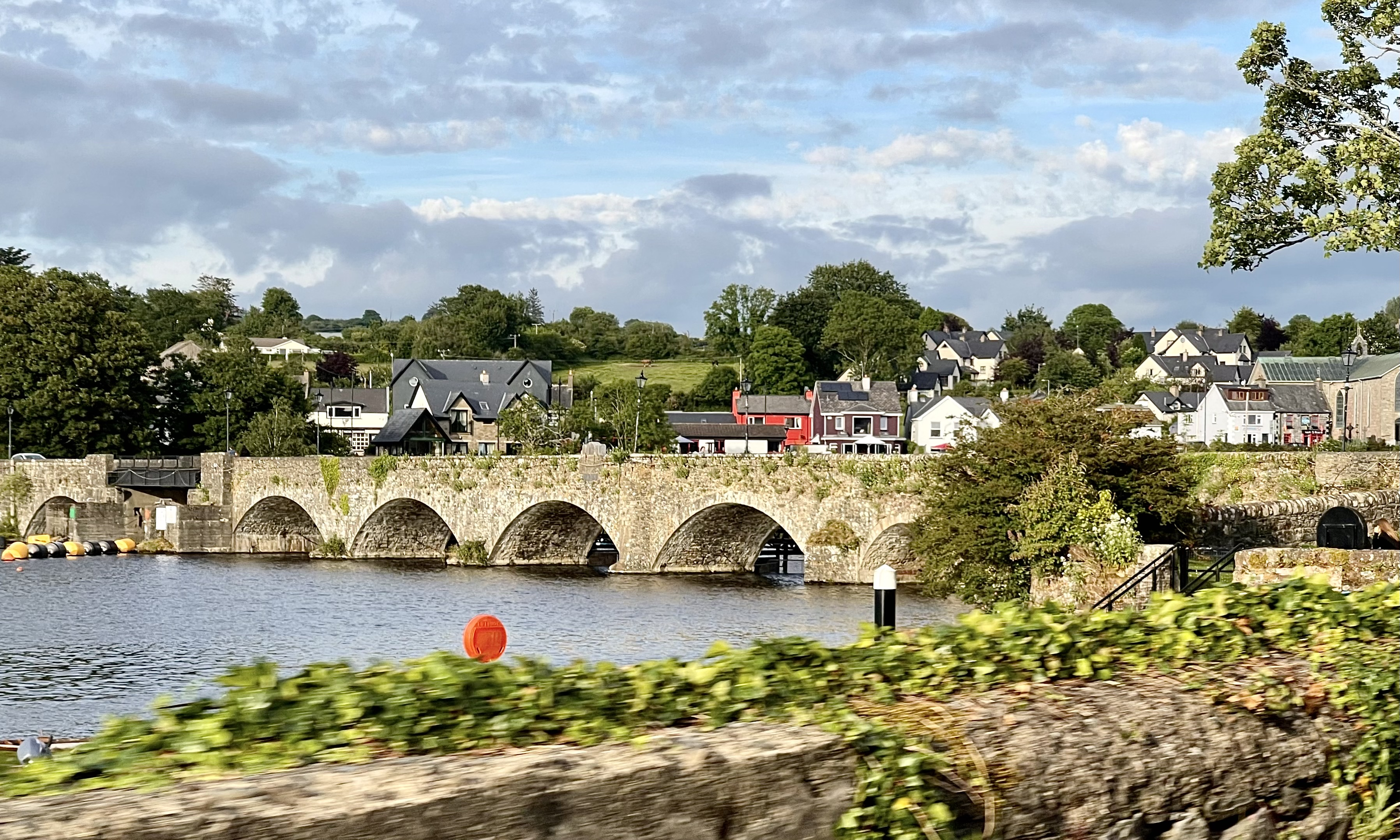
- Coordinates: 52.8080°N 8.4394°W
- Carries: R494 road (to R463)
- Crosses: River Shannon
- Locale: Between County Clare and County Tipperary, Ireland
- Heritage status: Protected structure

Characteristics
- Design: Masonry bridge
- No. of spans: 13
- No. of lanes: 1

History
- Rebuilt: c.1780 (main structure) c.1825 (central arches) c.1929 (lifting section)

Location
- Interactive map of Killaloe Bridge

Killaloe Bridge is a bridge over the River Shannon between Ballina in County Tipperary and Killaloe, County Clare in Ireland. Built on the site of an earlier structure (dating to c. 1650), the eighteenth-century bridge has thirteen arches and includes a lifting section that was added in 1929. Following the opening of a new road bridge nearby in May 2025, Killaloe Bridge was closed to vehicular traffic in October 2025 and is open only for pedestrians and cyclists. The bridge is a protected structure, listed on the Record of Protected Structures by both Clare County Council (#210) and Tipperary County Council (#S672).

== Monument ==
An ornate monument in the middle of the bridge commemorates four Irish Republican Army members who were shot on the bridge in 1920, during the Irish War of Independence. There is also a plaque recording the 1825 partial rebuild of the bridge.

== Eel management programme ==
A trap and transport scheme is in force on the Shannon as part of an eel management programme following the discovery of reducing populations within the River Shannon. This scheme is intended to ensure safe passage for young eels between Killaloe Bridge and the Shannon Estuary.

== New bridge crossing ==
In the early 21st century, Clare County Council and North Tipperary County Council presented proposals for a new road to bypass Killaloe, including a new Shannon bridge crossing, approximately 1 km south of the existing bridge. Amendments were made to the local area plans, and a mechanism for enforcing compulsory purchase order was confirmed in March 2013.

By 2018, detailed design planning was underway on works for the Killaloe bypass and proposed new bridge. As of 2020, roadworks in Killaloe and Ballina were underway, with a proposed "target for the commencement of construction" on the bridge in "Spring 2022". A "sod turning" ceremony was held in late 2022.

The new bridge, Brian Boru Bridge, officially opened to traffic on 22 May 2025 as part of the Killaloe Bypass. Later in 2025, the 18th-century Killaloe Bridge was closed to vehicular traffic.
