= Fintan mac Bóchra =

First man in Ireland according to Irish Mythology

In Irish mythology Fintan mac Bóchra (modern spelling: Fionntán), known as "the Wise", was a seer who accompanied Noah's granddaughter Cessair to Ireland before the deluge. Bóchra may be his mother, or may be a poetic reference to the sea.

He was one of only three men in the expedition, along with fifty women, so he, Cessair's father Bith, and the pilot, Ladra, had sixteen wives each. Fintan's wives are named: Cessair, Lot, Luam, Mall, Mar, Froechar, Femar, Faible, Foroll, Cipir, Torrian, Tamall, Tam, Abba, Alla, Baichne, and Sille. He married Ebliu later. His only son was Illann.

His wives and children were drowned when the flood arrived but he survived in the form of a salmon, remaining a year under the waters in a cave called Fintan's Grave. He then turned into an eagle and then a hawk then back to human form. He lived for 5500 years after the Deluge, becoming an advisor to the kings of Ireland. In this capacity he gave advice to the Fir Bolg king Eochaid mac Eirc when the Tuatha Dé Danann invaded, and fought in the first Battle of Magh Tuiredh.

He survived into the time of Fionn mac Cumhail, becoming the repository of all knowledge of Ireland and all history along with a magical hawk who was born at the same time as him. They meet at the end of their lives and recount their stories to each other. They decide to leave the mortal realm together sometime in the 5th century, after Ireland was converted to Christianity.

Due to his ability to shape-shift into a salmon and his honorific title as "The Wise", Fintan mac Bóchra is sometimes confused with a similarly named animal figure in Irish mythology more commonly known and referred to as the Salmon of Knowledge. On the other hand people often forget or remain unaware of the significance to the Fionn mac Cumhail legend, and effectively tell only half the story. There is a school of thought that the relation of Fionn mac Cumhail with the Salmon was a much later alternative to link him with the original knowledge of Ireland's first populations.

== See also ==
- Tuan mac Cairill, another Lebor Gabála Érenn character with the ability to shape-shift, and as a result, he lives for several thousand years.
