= Ballyartella =

Townland in County Tipperary, Ireland

Ballyartella Baile Uí Artaíle
- townland
- Location within Ireland
- Coordinates: 52.9015°N 8.2429°W
- Country: Ireland
- County: Tipperary

Ballyartella (Baile Uí Artaíle in Irish) is a townland in the historical Barony of Ormond Lower, County Tipperary, Ireland. It is 5 km north-west of Nenagh, between the Nenagh River and the R495 road.

== Notable structures ==
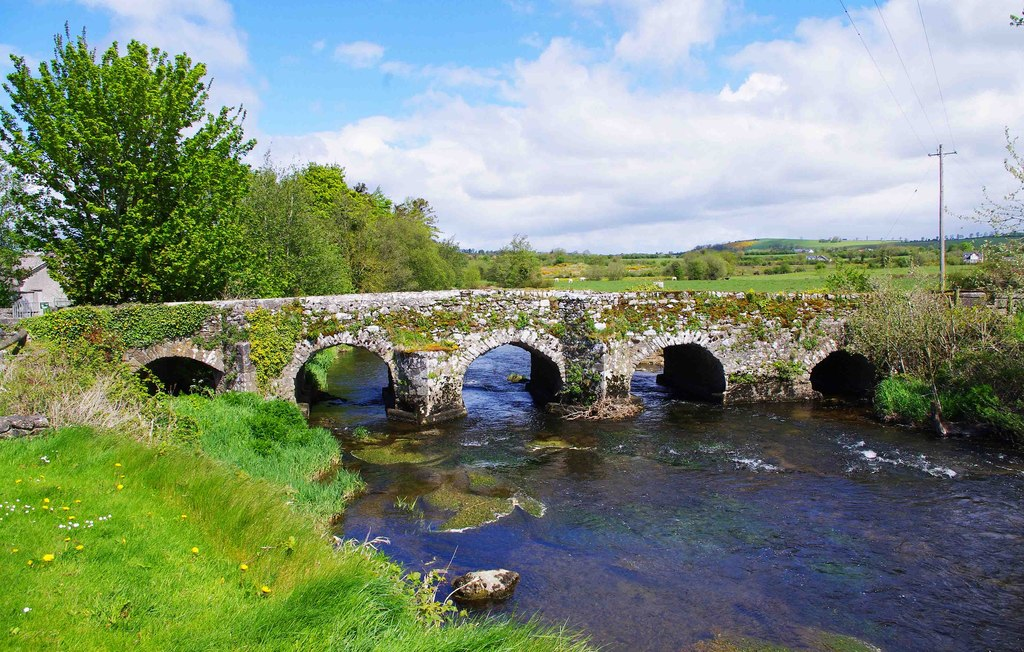
Ballyartella Bridge

- Ballyartella Bridge, a limestone bridge across the Nenagh River built about 1720. The bridge has pedestrian refuges to allow traffic to pass freely, it is listed on the National Inventory of Architectural Heritage as being of architectural and technical interest.
- Ballyartella Mill, a water-powered mill built on the banks of the Nenagh River which is still in use as a woollen mill with gift shop open to the public.
- Ballyartella Tower House a ruin located beside the Ballyartella bridge, which has been a ruin since the 17th century when the Countess of Ormond was listed as the proprietor.

== Recreation ==
Ballyartella is on one of the North Tipperary Cycle Routes. The 65-km route starts at Banba Square, Nenagh and is listed as a half day cycle. Sli Eala ("The Way of the Swan" in Irish), a public walkway between Nenagh and Dromineer passes through Ballyartella. For much of its length it follows the Nenagh River where mute swans can be seen.
