= Killaloe, County Clare =

Town in County Clare, Ireland

Killaloe Irish: Cill Dalua
- Town
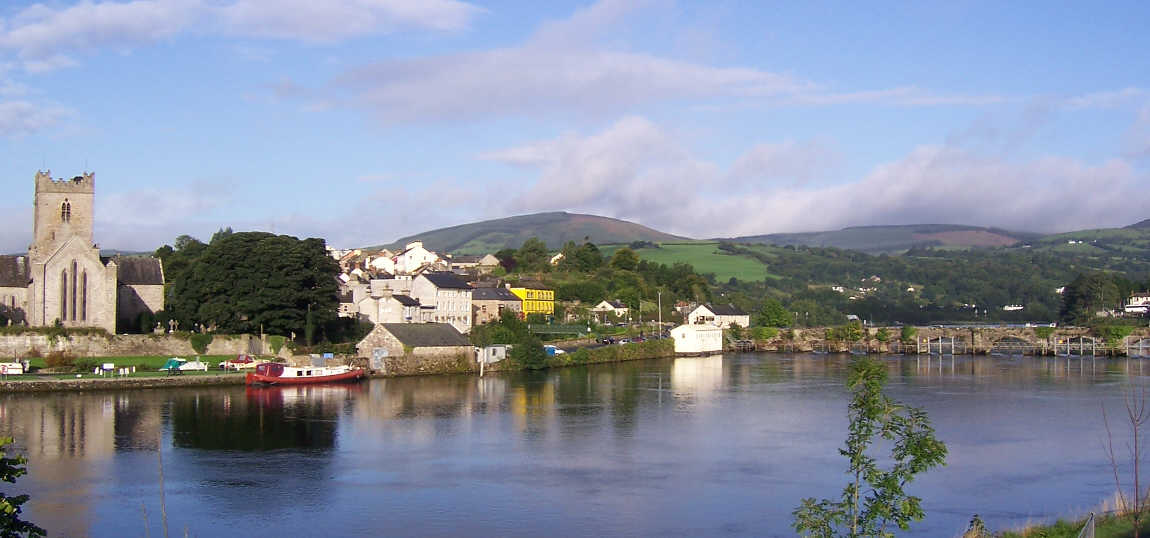
- Killaloe on the River Shannon with St Flannan's Cathedral on the left

- Location in Ireland
- Coordinates: 52°48′N 8°27′W
- Country: Ireland
- Province: Munster
- County: County Clare
- Elevation: 20 m (66 ft)

Population (2022)
  - Total: 1,666
- Time zone: UTC+0 (WET)
  - Summer (DST): UTC-1 (IST (WEST))
- Irish Grid Reference: R704736

Historical population
Year	Pop.	±%
1821	1,487	—
1831	2,243	+50.8%
1841	2,783	+24.1%
1851	2,218	−20.3%
1861	1,673	−24.6%
1871	1,479	−11.6%
1881	1,350	−8.7%
1891	1,339	−0.8%
1901	1,072	−19.9%
1911	987	−7.9%
1926	904	−8.4%
1936	890	−1.5%
1946	890	+0.0%
1951	901	+1.2%
1956	888	−1.4%
1961	835	−6.0%
1966	816	−2.3%
1971	871	+6.7%
1981	1,022	+17.3%
1986	1,033	+1.1%
1991	956	−7.5%
1996	972	+1.7%
2002	1,174	+20.8%
2006	1,035	−11.8%
2011	1,292	+24.8%
2016	1,484	+14.9%
2022	1,666	+12.3%

Killaloe (/ˌkɪləˈluː/ kil-ə-LOO; Irish: Cill Dalua, meaning 'church of Dalua') is a small town in east County Clare, Ireland. It lies on the River Shannon on the western bank of Lough Derg and is connected by Killaloe Bridge to the "twin town" of Ballina, on the eastern bank of the lake.

The Killaloe Electoral Area is one of six such areas in County Clare and returns four members to Clare County Council. Killaloe is at the center of the Killaloe civil parish.

== History ==
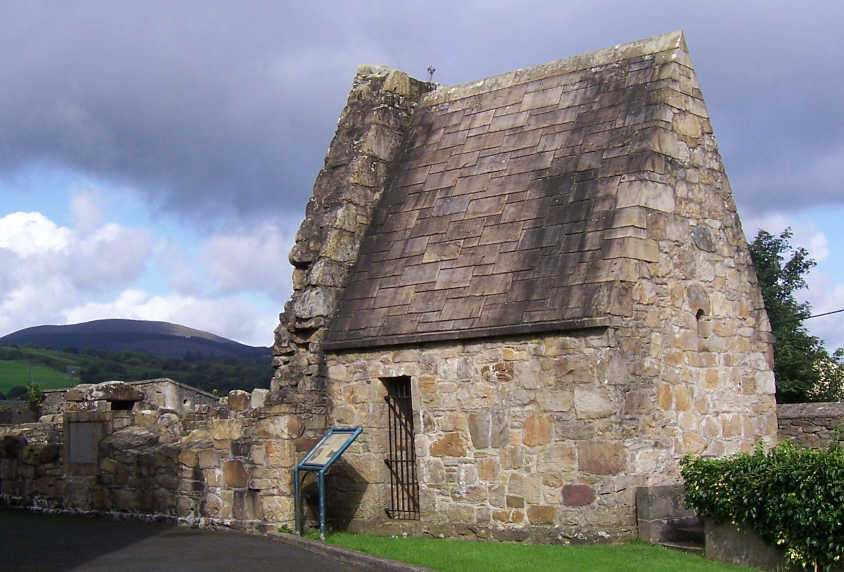
St Lua's Oratory next to the St Flannan's Catholic Church, Killaloe

The town owes its origin to a sixth-century monastic settlement founded by Saint Molua, or Lua, on an island in the Shannon 1 km downstream from the present Killaloe Bridge which later moved onto the mainland. In the tenth century it was a base for Brian Boru as it controlled the strategic crossing of the Shannon above Limerick, where the Vikings were in control. Brian Boru had his palace, Kincora (Ceann Coradh), on the high ground where the current Catholic church stands. Therefore, between 1002 and 1014, when he was the High King, Killaloe was effectively the capital of all Ireland. 2 km north of the town, his fort, Beal Boruma, stood on the site of an Iron Age ringfort at the head of Lough Derg, where a ford crossed the river. The word "Boruma" comes from the tribute paid by those crossing the river and is thought to be the origin of Brian Boru's name.

St Flannan's Cathedral (Church of Ireland) was built between 1185 and 1225, with an oratory for the same saint, who had been the abbot of Killaloe in the seventh century. The cathedral was destroyed and rebuilt in the fourteenth century. Of the original building, only a romanesque arch survives. In Elizabethan times, Ennis was chosen as the county town of Clare, and the importance of Killaloe declined.

In 1650, Cromwell spent 10 days on the opposite side of the Shannon at Ballina, exploring ways to cross the river, which was the defensive line of Catholic and Royalist forces before the Siege of Limerick. 40 years later, Patrick Sarsfield was the leader of the Jacobite forces here, harrying the Williamite forces advancing on Limerick.

The earliest mention of a (wooden) bridge across the river is in 1013. This was often repaired and eventually replaced by a 17 arch stone bridge in the early eighteenth century, later reduced to 13 arches. Most of the houses in the lower part of the town were built in the eighteenth century. In the nineteenth century the Shannon Steam Navigation Company had its headquarters here and constructed a canal to bypass the rapids below the town.

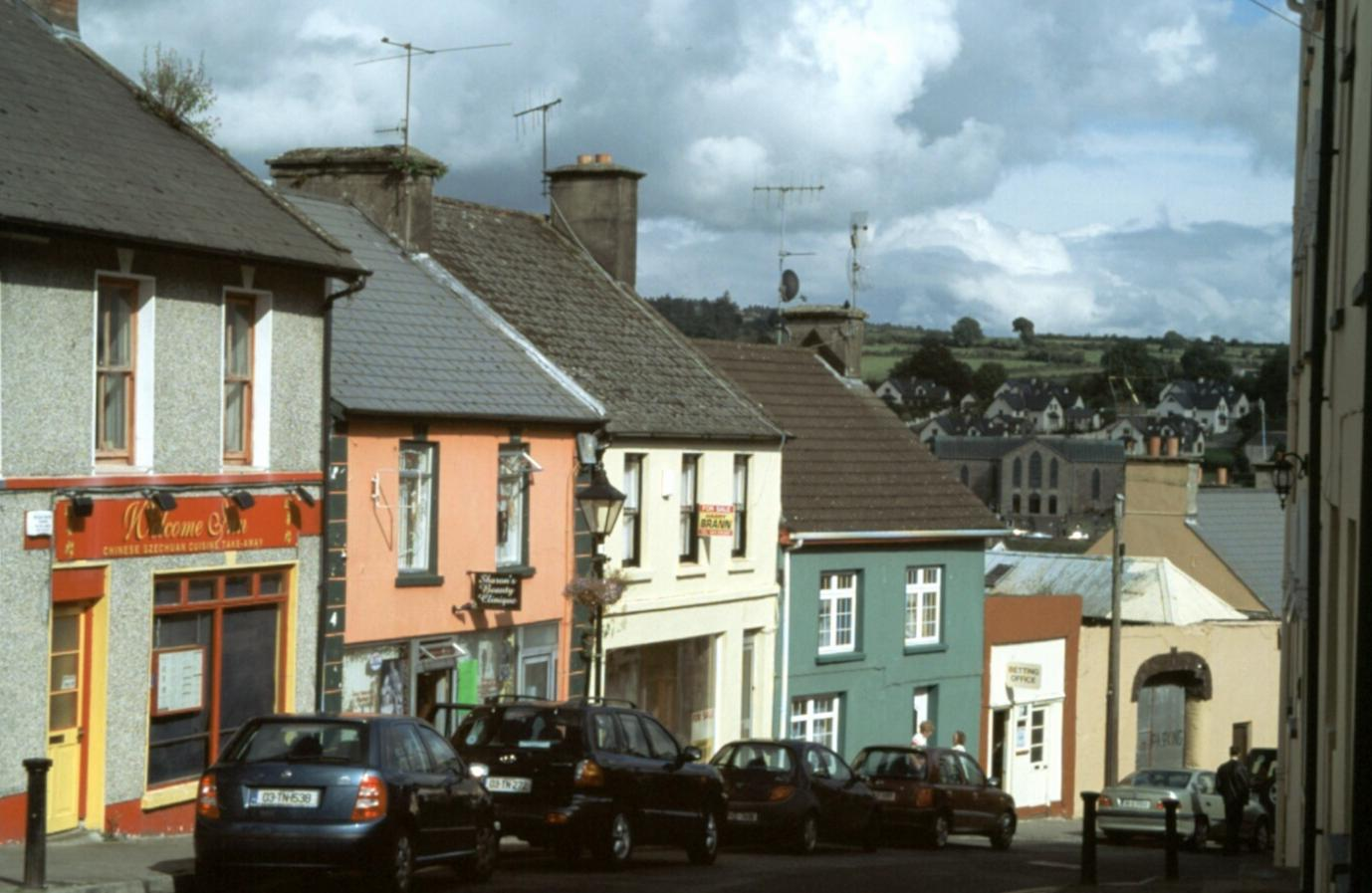
Main Street

St. Lua's oratory, built between 1000 and 1150, was moved from Friar's island to the site of the Catholic Church when the hydroelectric scheme at Ardnacrusha was constructed in the 1920s. Killaloe parish is part of the Roman Catholic Diocese of Killaloe. Parish churches are Sacred Heart & St Lua's in Garraunboy, St Flannan's in Killaloe and St Thomas' in Bridgetown.

In 2022, Killaloe became twinned as a sister city with New London, Wisconsin USA.

In late 2025, the 18th-century Killaloe Bridge was closed to vehicular traffic, after a new bridge, named for Brian Boru, was opened in May 2025.

== Amenities ==
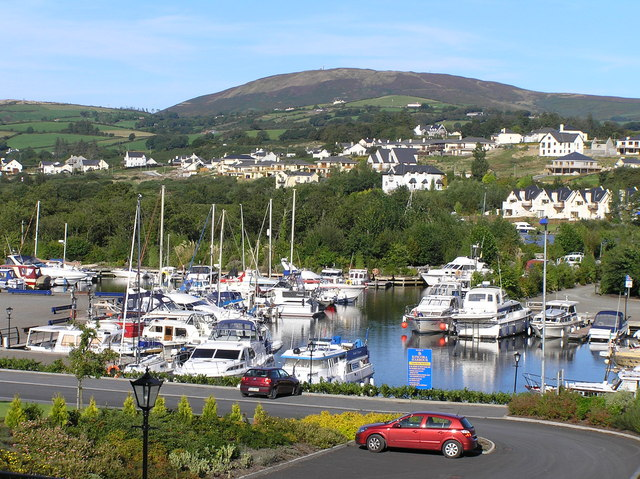
Killaloe Marina

Killaloe is home to the secondary school, St Anne's Community College, which opened in 1987. The University of Limerick has an outdoor pursuits centre near Killaloe on the shore of the lake.

Killaloe has marina facilities for private and rented pleasure craft on the River Shannon network. A parkrun takes place in Clarisford Park each Saturday.

== Natural environment ==
A trap and transport scheme is in force on the Shannon as part of an eel management programme following the discovery of reducing populations within the River Shannon. This scheme is intended to ensure safe passage for young eels between Killaloe Bridge and the Shannon Estuary.

== People ==
Killaloe was the birthplace of Ireland's noted High King, Brian Boru. He ruled from Kincora, which is believed to have been in modern-day Killaloe. American president Ronald Reagan's history has been traced back to Killaloe, to Brian Boru's father, Cennétig mac Lorcáin.

Former Ireland rugby international captain Keith Wood, also the inaugural IRB International Player of the Year in 2001, is a Killaloe native and owner of the Wood & Bell Café and Restaurant.

Anthony Foley, also a rugby international, and captain of Munster's 2005–06 Heineken Cup winning team, was also a resident.

Brendan Grace, an Irish comedian, also had a house and a pub called Brendan Grace's in Killaloe. It closed in 2011.

== In fiction ==
Killaloe is the home town of Phineas Finn, the fictional hero of two of Anthony Trollope's Palliser novels, Phineas Finn and Phineas Redux. In Phineas Finn, Killaloe is presented as a lively, if provincial, social centre. Phineas's father, Dr Malachai Finn, is well known and respected 'in counties Clare, Limerick, Tipperary, and Galway'. Dr Finn is a friend of the Roman Catholic Bishop, another prominent Killaloe resident, and personal physician to the Earl of Tulla, who lives on his estate 'not more than ten miles from Killaloe'. Phineas returns to Killaloe for extended periods to spend time with his parents and with his five sisters and their friend, Miss Mary Flood Jones, who later becomes his first wife.

The 1917 comic song Paddy McGinty's Goat mentions Killaloe as the scene of the events it describes, while the Gaelic Storm song "Damn Near Died in Killaloe" from the 2017 album Go Climb a Tree is set in the town and mentions it repeatedly.

== Annalistic references ==
See Annals of Inisfallen (AI)

- AI991.5 Repose of Scandlán son of Tadc, erenagh of Cell Dá Lua.
- AI1027.7 Tadc son of Eochu, abbots of Cell Dá Lua, rested.
- AI1031.2 Ua Taidc, coarb of Flann, son of Fairchellach, was killed.

== See also ==
- List of towns and villages in Ireland
