= Ballina, County Tipperary =

Town in County Tipperary, Ireland

Ballina Béal an Átha
- Town
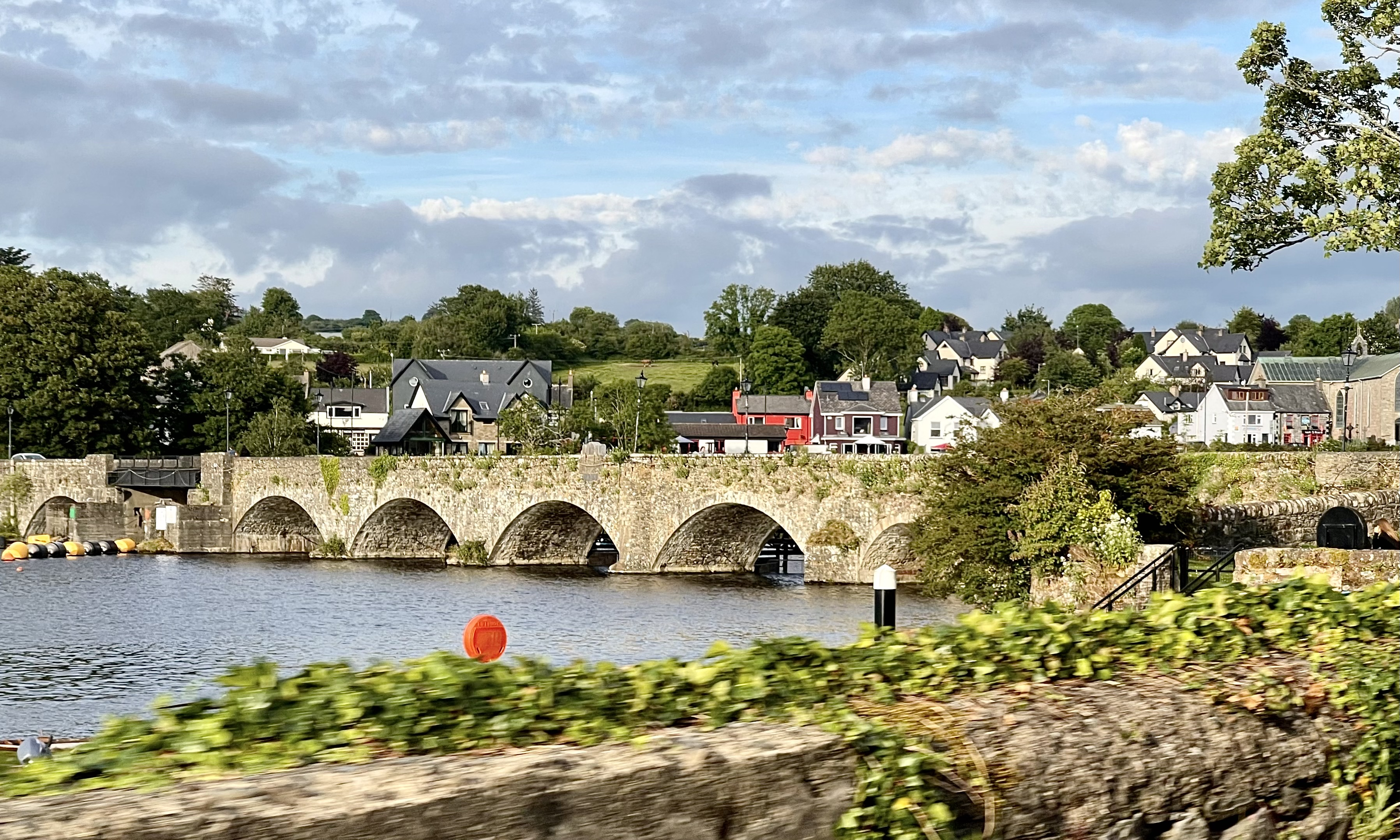
- Ballina as viewed across Killaloe Bridge, which joins Ballina and Killaloe

- Location in Ireland
- Coordinates: 52°48′24″N 8°26′06″W
- Country: Ireland
- Province: Munster
- County: County Tipperary
- Elevation: 20 m (66 ft)

Population (2022)
  - Total: 2,595
- Irish Grid Reference: R704736

Ballina (historically Bellanaha), from Irish: Béal an Átha, meaning 'mouth of the ford', is a census town that lies on the River Shannon in County Tipperary, Ireland. It is situated on the eastern shore of Lough Derg across from its 'twin-town' of Killaloe on the west bank of the lake. The towns are joined by Killaloe Bridge.

The annual Brian Boru Festival takes place in early July each year. A joint celebration between the two towns of the ancient High King of Ireland, Brian Boru, it involves many community-based activities including a hurling match between the teams from both towns.

Ballina has a primary school, Ballina National School, with the nearest secondary school, St. Anne's Community College, present in Killaloe.

== History ==
Ballina was, along with Killaloe on the other bank, an important stopping point for barges traveling up the River Shannon. In the 19th and early 20th centuries, bargemen would pass through Ballina on their way to deliver goods to Dublin. However, this began to decline when train lines were set up to link it to other major lines, making the transport of goods cheaper. As a result, the barges, while returning for a brief period during the Emergency (1939–1945), had disappeared by the 1920s and 1930s. Having been replaced by new lines which linked Limerick directly to Dublin and falling into disrepair, the railway tracks were removed in the 1950s.

During the Irish War of Independence (1919–1921), four young men were shot on the road bridge between Ballina and Killaloe as suspected IRA men by the Black and Tans and auxiliaries. There is commemorative plaque on the bridge, close to where the men were shot.

== Transport ==
The main crossing point between Ballina and Killaloe is Killaloe Bridge, an eighteenth-century single-lane bridge. For a long period, there was no traffic control system present on the bridge. While it was possible for cars to pass each other, it was difficult for HGVs and cars, and impossible for two HGVs, to pass. This led to the introduction of a traffic light system which, while leading to delays at peak times, improved safety and traffic flow on the bridge.

In December 2006, North Tipperary County Council sought tenders for a 'design and build' contract for a new crossing on the Shannon. As of October 2021, reports suggested that "Spring 2022" was a "target for the commencement of construction". A "sod turning" ceremony was held in late 2022, at which point the projected completion date was updated to 2024.

== Population ==
Identified as a "service town" in the North Tipperary County Development Plan 2010–2016, Ballina saw "record" population growth in the late 20th and early 21st centuries. In the 20 years between the 1991 and 2011 census, Ballina's population grew by more than 500%, from 477 to 2,442 inhabitants. As of the 2022 census, the town had a population of 2,959.

== Sport ==
Ballina has a Gaelic games club which is made up of Ballina and Boher. In 1885 Ballina GAA club was formally established. At a convention in Nenagh on Sunday 20 November 1887, 35 affiliated clubs were represented by their respective delegates. This list of 35 included two from the parish, namely Ballina and Boher. In 1902 Michael Minihan of Boher became North Tipperary Chairman. In 1883 a Ballina / Boher combination under the name of Kincora, beat Killaloe. Which is one of the first inter-county games on record, with Kincora recording a victory of 2–1 to 0–1.

Mark Van Drumpt, who served as lead physiotherapist for the Limerick county hurling team during its 2018 and 2020 All-Ireland Senior Hurling Championship winning campaigns, lived in Ballina.

== See also ==
- List of towns and villages in County Tipperary
