= Lough Derg (Shannon) =

Lake in Ireland

- Loch Deirgeirt
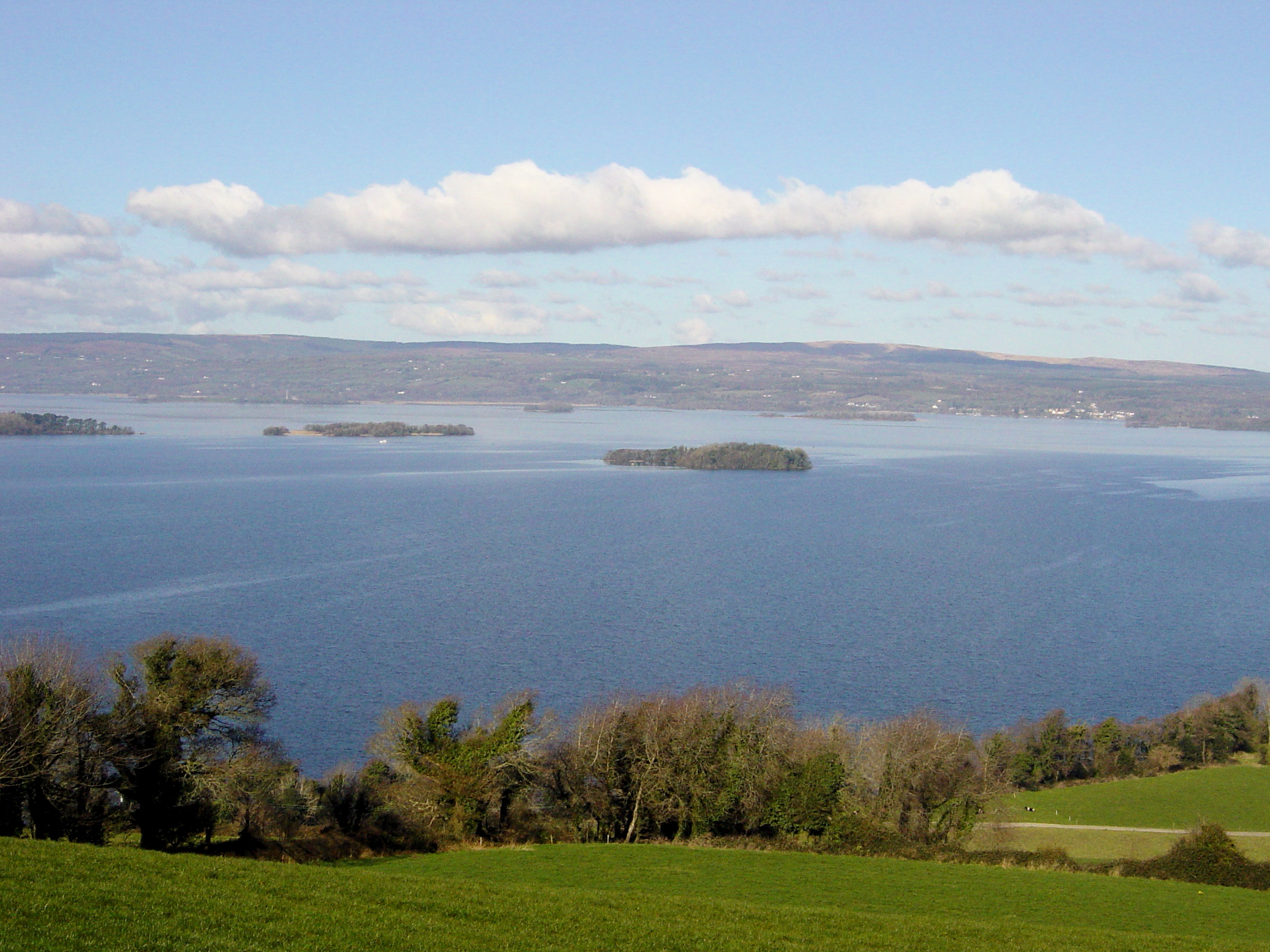

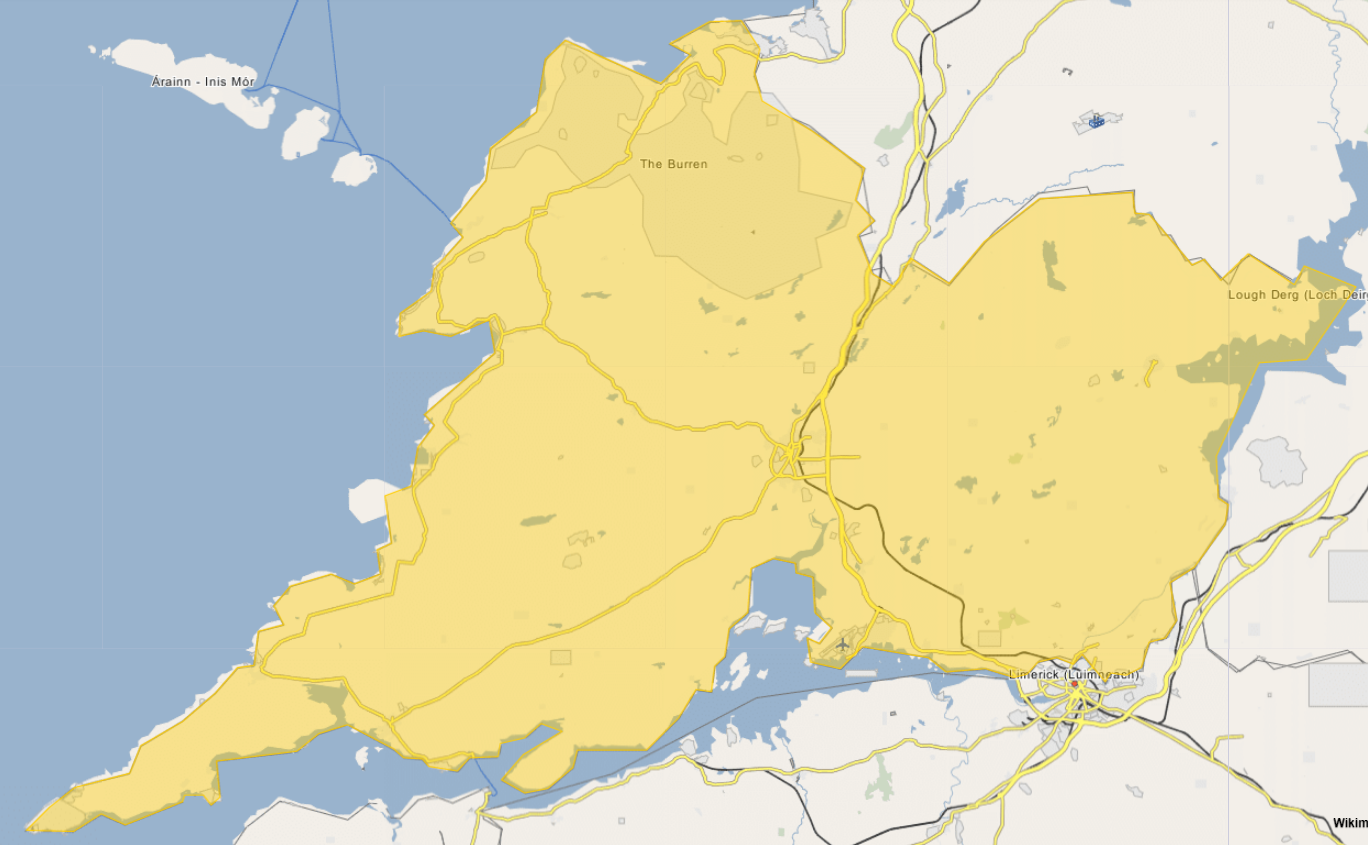
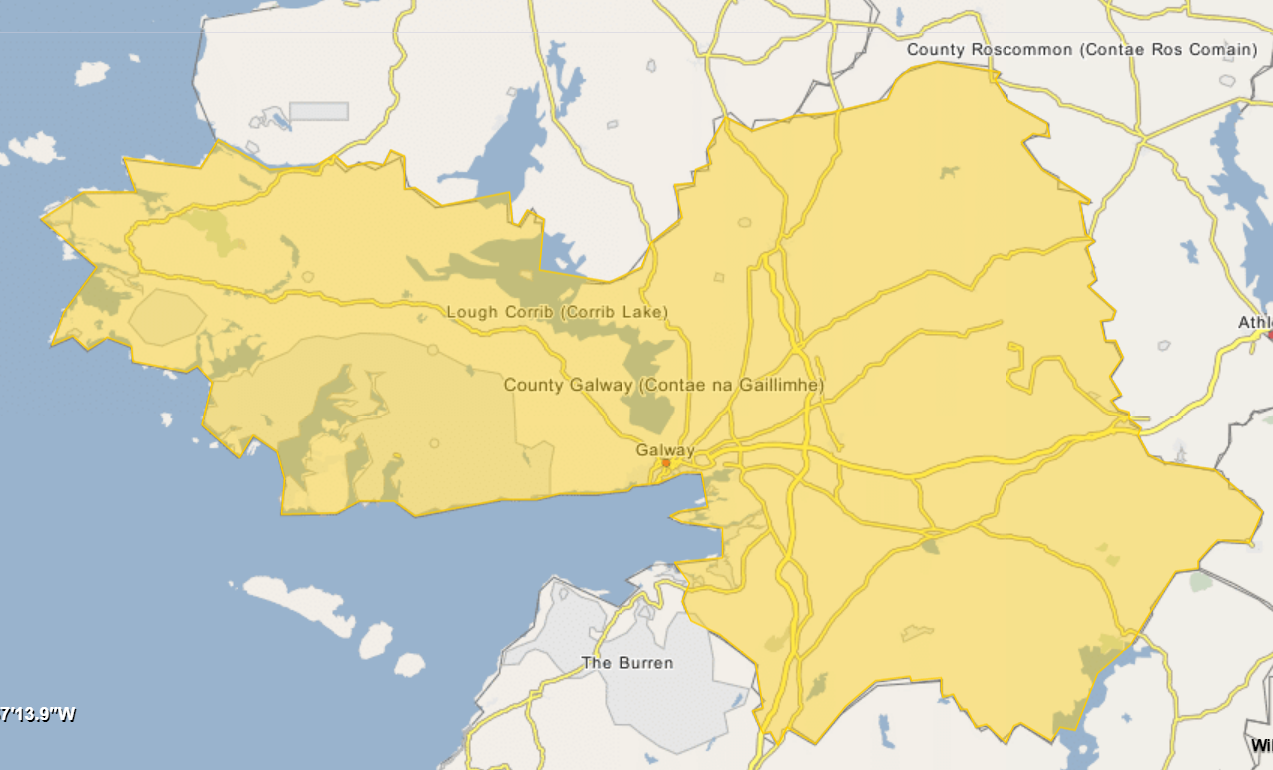
- Lough Derg (County Clare) Lough Derg (County Galway)

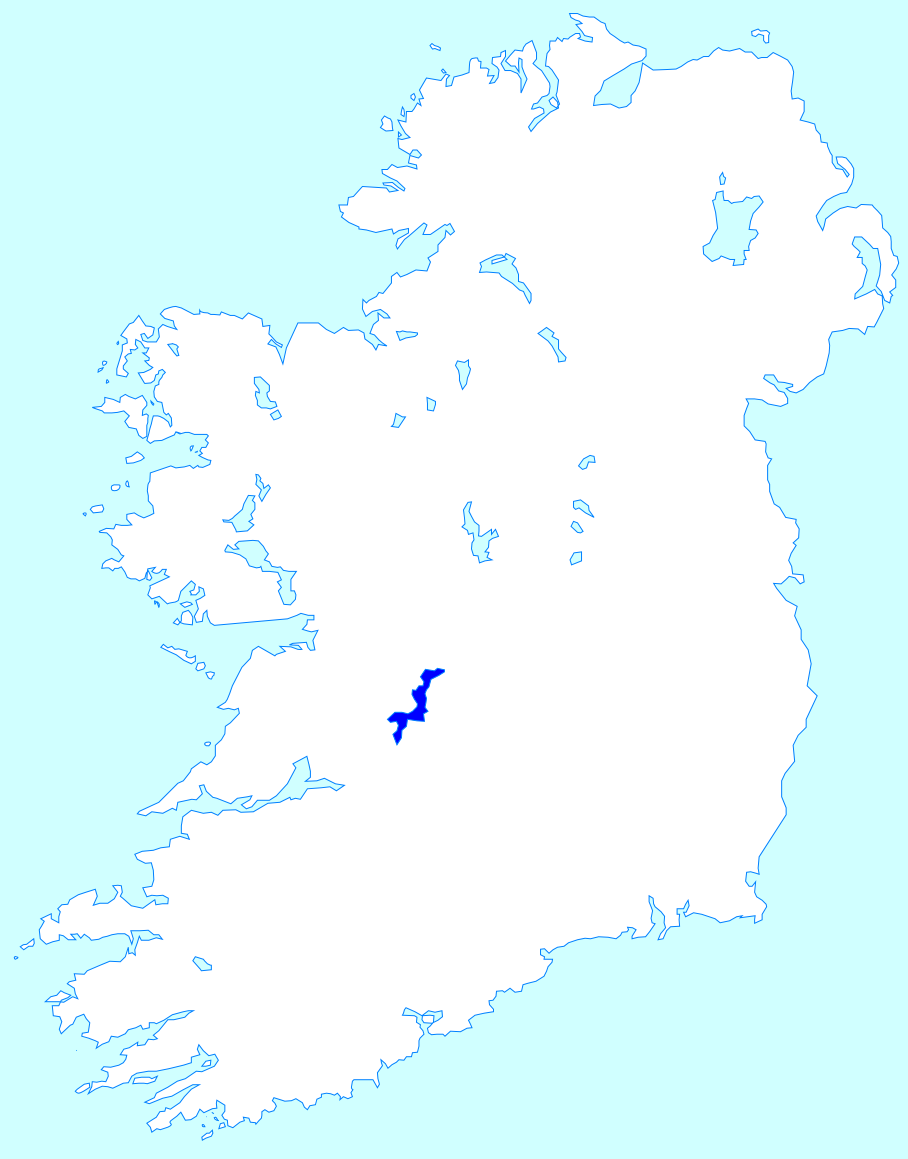
- Location in Ireland
- Coordinates: 52°59′N 8°19′W
- Type: Freshwater lake
- Primary inflows: River Shannon
- Primary outflows: River Shannon
- Basin countries: Ireland
- Max. length: 38.6 km (24.0 mi)
- Max. width: 12.9 km (8.0 mi)
- Surface area: 130 km^{2} (50 sq mi)
- Average depth: 7.6 m (25 ft)
- Max. depth: 36 m (118 ft)
- Water volume: 0.887 km^{3} (0.213 cu mi)
- Residence time: 0.15 years
- Shore length^{1}: 179,000 m (587,000 ft)
- Surface elevation: 33.5 m (110 ft)
- Settlements: Garrykennedy, Portumna, Killaloe & Ballina, Dromineer, Terryglass
- ^{1} Shore length is not a well-defined measure.

Lough Derg, historically Lough Dergart (Irish: Loch Deirgeirt), is a freshwater lake in the Shannon River Basin, Ireland. It is the third-biggest on the island of Ireland (after Lough Neagh and Lough Corrib) and the second largest lake in the Republic of Ireland.

It is a long, narrow lake, with shores in counties Clare (south-west), Galway (north-west), and Tipperary (to the east). It is the southernmost of three large lakes on the River Shannon; the others being Lough Ree and Lough Allen. Towns and villages on Lough Derg include Portumna, Killaloe & Ballina, Dromineer, Terryglass, Mountshannon and Garrykennedy.

The lake's name evolved from the Irish Loch Deirgdheirc. This was one of the names of The Dagda, the father of gods and men in Irish mythology, and literally means "red eye".

Lough Derg has many islands including Inis Cealtra or Holy Island.

== Geography ==
At its deepest, the lake is 36 m (118 ft) deep and covers an area of 130 km^{2} (50 sq mi). Close downstream from where Lough Derg empties into the Shannon are the falls of Doonass, the largest fall on the otherwise gently sloping river. Nearby is the location of the hydroelectric power plant at Ardnacrusha, which, when built in 1927 was the world's largest.

== Usage ==
In the nineteenth century, Lough Derg was an important artery from the port at Limerick to Dublin through the canals in the midlands of Ireland. Navigable over its full 38.6 km (24.0 mi) length, Lough Derg is today popular with cruisers and other pleasure craft, as well as sailing and fishing. The University of Limerick has an activity centre by the lake, just north of Killaloe, where there are canoes, kayaks, windsurfing, sailing dingies, and other recreations.

Lough Derg is home to an RNLI Lifeboat which is based at Dromineer, the first inland station in Ireland. In June 2013, 35 people were brought to safety when a major rescue effort was undertaken after an international rowing event was hit by severe weather.

Dublin City Council published a plan in 2011 for a pipeline to supply up to 350 million litres of water a day from Lough Derg to Dublin city and region. In 2016 the Parteen Basin at the south of lough was chosen as the proposed site of extraction. Water would be pumped to a break pressure tank at Knockanacree near Cloughjordan in County Tipperary and gravity fed from there to Dublin.

== Ecology ==
A breeding pair of white-tailed eagles first nested on an island in Lough Derg in 2012. This marked a great success for the Irish reintroduction programme started in the summer of 2007.

Nitellopsis obtusa, an invasive alga in the family Characeae (stoneworts), was first recorded in Ireland in this lough in 2016. In 2021, invasive quagga mussels were discovered in the lake and in Lough Ree by a research team from UCD.

The North-East Shore is listed as a Special Area of Conservation.

== Towns/villages ==
- Ballina
- Dromineer
- Garrykennedy
- Kilgarvan
- Killaloe
- Mountshannon
- Portroe
- Portumna
- Scarriff (location of regional Waterways Ireland office)
- Terryglass
- Whitegate

== See also ==
- List of loughs in Ireland
