= Government of the 21st Dáil =

Governments of Ireland 1977 to 1981

There were two governments of the 21st Dáil, which was elected at the 1977 general election on 16 June 1977. Both were single-party majority Fianna Fáil governments. The 15th government of Ireland (5 July 1977 – 11 December 1979) was led by Jack Lynch as Taoiseach and lasted for 2 years, 159 days. The 16th government of Ireland (11 December 1979 – 30 June 1981) was led by Charles Haughey and lasted for 1 year, 201 days.

== 15th government of Ireland ==
15th government of Ireland
- Government of Ireland

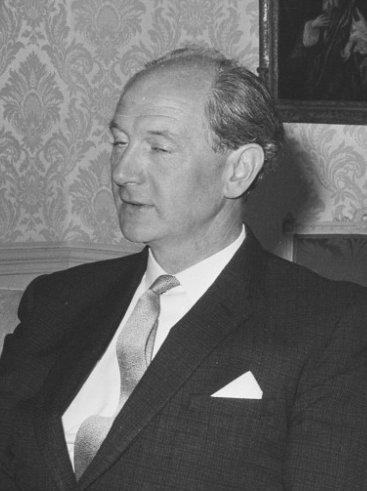
- Date formed: 5 July 1977
- Date dissolved: 11 December 1979

People and organisations
- President: Patrick Hillery
- Taoiseach: Jack Lynch
- Tánaiste: George Colley
- Total no. of members: 15
- Member party: Fianna Fáil
- Status in legislature: Majority government
- Opposition party: Fine Gael
- Opposition leader: Garret FitzGerald

History
- Election: 1977 general election
- Legislature terms: 21st Dáil; 14th Seanad
- Predecessor: 14th government
- Successor: 16th government

=== Nomination of Taoiseach ===
The 21st Dáil first met on 5 July 1977. In the debate on the nomination of Taoiseach, Fianna Fáil leader Jack Lynch was proposed, and this proposal was carried with 82 votes in favour and 61 votes against. Lynch was appointed as Taoiseach by president Patrick Hillery.

5 July 1977; Nomination of Jack Lynch (FF) as Taoiseach; Motion proposed by Vivion de Valera and seconded by Kit Ahern; Absolute majority: 75/148
Vote	Parties	Votes
Yes	Fianna Fáil (82)	82 / 148
No	Fine Gael (43), Labour Party (16), Independent (2)	61 / 148
Not voting	Ceann Comhairle (1), Fianna Fáil (1), Labour Party (1), Independent Fianna Fáil (1), Independent (1)	5 / 148

=== Members of the Government ===
After his appointment as Taoiseach by the president, Jack Lynch proposed the members of the government and they were approved by the Dáil. They were appointed by the president on the same day.

Office	Name	Term
Taoiseach	Jack Lynch	1977–1979
Tánaiste	George Colley	1977–1979
Minister for Finance	George Colley	1977–1979
Minister for the Public Service	George Colley	1977–1979
Minister for Agriculture	Jim Gibbons	1977–1979
Minister for Defence	Bobby Molloy	1977–1979
Minister for Economic Planning and Development (Note: The Department of Economic Planning and Development was established by the Ministers and Secretaries (Amendment) Act 1977 which was commenced on 13 December 1977. O'Donoghue was a member of the government as a minister without portfolio until that date but was given the title of Minister for Economic Planning and Development on 8 July 1977.)	Martin O'Donoghue	1977–1979
Minister for Education	John Wilson	1977–1979
Minister for the Environment (Note: The Department of Local Government was renamed as the Department of the Environment on 17 August 1977.)	Sylvester Barrett	1977–1979
Minister for Fisheries (Note: The Department of Fisheries was renamed as the Department of Fisheries and Forestry on 15 July 1978.)	Brian Lenihan	1977–1979
Minister for Foreign Affairs	Michael O'Kennedy	1977–1979
Minister for the Gaeltacht	Denis Gallagher	1977–1979
Minister for Health	Charles Haughey	1977–1979
Minister for Social Welfare	Charles Haughey	1977–1979
Minister for Industry, Commerce and Energy (Note: The Department of Industry and Commerce was renamed as the Department of Industry, Commerce and Energy on 23 September 1977.)	Desmond O'Malley	1977–1979
Minister for Justice	Gerry Collins	1977–1979
Minister for Labour	Gene Fitzgerald	1977–1979
Minister for Posts and Telegraphs	Pádraig Faulkner	1977–1979
Minister for Tourism and Transport (Note: The Department of Transport and Power was renamed as the Department of Tourism and Transport on 23 September 1977.)	Pádraig Faulkner	1977–1979

=== Attorney General ===
On 5 July 1977, Anthony J. Hederman SC was appointed by the president as Attorney General on the nomination of the Taoiseach.

=== Parliamentary Secretaries (5 July 1977 – 1 January 1978) ===
On 5 July 1977, the Government appointed Parliamentary Secretaries on the nomination of the Taoiseach.

Name	Office
Patrick Lalor	Government Chief Whip
Patrick Lalor	Parliamentary Secretary to the Minister for Defence
David Andrews	Parliamentary Secretary to the Minister for Foreign Affairs
Jim Tunney	Parliamentary Secretary to the Minister for Education
Tom Fitzpatrick	Parliamentary Secretary to the Minister for Posts and Telegraphs
Tom Fitzpatrick	Parliamentary Secretary to the Minister for Tourism and Transport
Pearse Wyse	Parliamentary Secretary to the Minister for Finance
Thomas Hussey	Parliamentary Secretary to the Minister for Agriculture
Máire Geoghegan-Quinn	Parliamentary Secretary to the Minister for Industry and Commerce

=== Ministers of State (1 January 1978 – 11 December 1979) ===
Following the enactment of the Ministers and Secretaries (Amendment) (No. 2) Act 1977, the post of Parliamentary Secretary was abolished and replaced by a new post of Minister of State. A maximum of 10 Ministers of State could be appointed. On 14 December 1977, Taoiseach Jack Lynch announced that the existing Parliamentary Secretaries would be appointed as Ministers of State in their respective departments with effect from 1 January 1978, and the appointment of three TDs as additional Ministers of State who would also take office on that date.

Name	Department(s)
Patrick Lalor	Taoiseach (Government Chief Whip)
Patrick Lalor	Defence
David Andrews	Foreign Affairs
Jim Tunney	Education
Tom Fitzpatrick	Posts and Telegraphs
Tom Fitzpatrick	Tourism and Transport
Pearse Wyse	Finance
Thomas Hussey	Agriculture
Máire Geoghegan-Quinn	Industry, Commerce and Energy
John O'Leary	Environment
Ray MacSharry	Public Service
Ray Burke	Industry, Commerce and Energy
==== Changes 1 January 1979 ==== Appointment to additional department.
Name	Department(s)
David Andrews	Justice
==== Changes 1 July 1979 ==== Following resignation of Patrick Lalor on 17 June 1979 on his election to the European Parliament.
Name	Department(s)
Michael Woods	Taoiseach (Government Chief Whip); Defence

=== Decisions of the government ===
This government approved the Nuclear Energy Board plans for a plant at Carnsore Point to go ahead. Desmond O'Malley, as Minister for Industry, Commerce and Energy, was central to this policy. Later the 16th Government, during the same Dáil, dropped these plans.

=== Confidence in the government ===
On 29 May 1979, Frank Cluskey proposed a motion of no confidence in the government, citing the "serious economic mismanagement of the country by the Government". Brian Lenihan, Minister for Fisheries and Forestry, proposed an amendment to the motion expressing "satisfaction at the Government's management of the economy". On the following day, the amendment was carried by a vote of 67 to 46.

=== Resignation ===
Shortly after the loss by Fianna Fáil of two by-elections in Cork on 7 November 1979, Jack Lynch resigned as Fianna Fáil leader. Charles Haughey won the leadership election held on 7 December 1979. Lynch resigned as Taoiseach on 11 December 1979.

== 16th government of Ireland ==
16th government of Ireland
- Government of Ireland

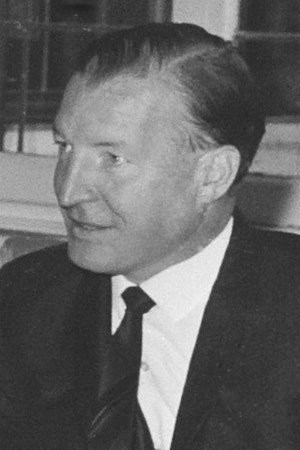
- Date formed: 11 December 1979
- Date dissolved: 30 June 1981

People and organisations
- President: Patrick Hillery
- Taoiseach: Charles Haughey
- Tánaiste: George Colley
- Total no. of members: 15
- Member party: Fianna Fáil
- Status in legislature: Majority government
- Opposition party: Fine Gael
- Opposition leader: Garret FitzGerald

History
- Legislature terms: 21st Dáil; 14th Seanad
- Predecessor: 15th government
- Successor: 17th government

The 16th government was formed by Charles Haughey following the resignation of Jack Lynch.

=== Nomination of Taoiseach ===
On 11 December 1979, Haughey was proposed for the nomination of the Dáil for the position of Taoiseach, and this proposal was carried with 82 votes in favour and 62 votes against. Haughey was appointed as Taoiseach by president Patrick Hillery.

11 December 1979; Nomination of Charles Haughey (FF) as Taoiseach; Motion proposed by Jack Lynch; Absolute majority: 75/148
Vote	Parties	Votes
Yes	Fianna Fáil (82)	82 / 148
No	Fine Gael (44), Labour Party (17), Independent (1)	62 / 148
Not voting	Ceann Comhairle (1), Fine Gael (1), Independent Fianna Fáil (1), Independent (1)	4 / 148

=== Members of the Government ===
After his appointment as Taoiseach by the president, Charles Haughey proposed the members of the government and they were approved by the Dáil on 12 December. They were appointed by the president on the same day.

Office	Name	Term
Taoiseach	Charles Haughey	1979–1981
Tánaiste	George Colley	1979–1981
Minister for Tourism and Transport (Note: The Department of Tourism and Transport was renamed as the Department of Transport on 25 January 1980.)	George Colley	1979–1980
Minister for Agriculture	Ray MacSharry	1979–1981
Minister for Defence	Pádraig Faulkner	1979–1980
Minister for Economic Planning and Development (Note: The functions of the Department of Economic Planning were transferred to the Department of Finance on 1 January 1980.) (Note: The Department of Economic Planning and Development was renamed as the Department of Energy on 21 January 1980.)	Michael O'Kennedy	1979–1980
Minister for Finance	Michael O'Kennedy	1979–1980
Minister for the Public Service	Michael O'Kennedy	1979–1980
Minister for Education	John Wilson	1979–1981
Minister for the Environment	Sylvester Barrett	1979–1980
Minister for Fisheries and Forestry	Paddy Power	1979–1981
Minister for Foreign Affairs	Brian Lenihan	1979–1981
Minister for the Gaeltacht	Máire Geoghegan-Quinn	1979–1981
Minister for Health	Michael Woods	1979–1981
Minister for Social Welfare	Michael Woods	1979–1981
Minister for Industry, Commerce and Energy (Note: The Department of Industry, Commerce and Energy was renamed as the Department of Industry, Commerce and Tourism on 23 January 1980.)	Desmond O'Malley	1979–1981
Minister for Justice	Gerry Collins	1979–1981
Minister for Labour	Gene Fitzgerald	1979–1980
Minister for Posts and Telegraphs	Albert Reynolds	1979–1981
==== Changes 22 January 1980 ====
Office	Name	Term
Minister for Energy	George Colley	1980–1981
==== Changes 25 January 1980 ==== Changes made to ministerial roles.
Office	Name	Term
Minister for Transport	Albert Reynolds (Note: Held in addition to the Posts and Telegraphs portfolio.)	1980–1981
==== Changes 24 March 1980 ==== Changes made to ministerial roles.
Office	Name	Term
Minister for the Public Service	Gene Fitzgerald (Note: Held in addition to the Labour portfolio.)	1980–1981
==== Changes 15 October 1980 ==== Election of Pádraig Faulkner as Ceann Comhairle.
Office	Name	Term
Minister for Defence	Sylvester Barrett	1980–1981
Minister for the Environment	Ray Burke	1980–1981
==== Changes 16 December 1980 ==== Appointment of Michael O'Kennedy as European Commissioner.
Office	Name	Term
Minister for Finance	Gene Fitzgerald (Note: Held in addition to the Public Service portfolio.)	1980–1981
Minister for Labour	Tom Nolan	1980–1981

=== Attorney General ===
On 11 December 1979, Anthony J. Hederman SC was re-appointed by the president as Attorney General on the nomination of the Taoiseach.

=== Ministers of State ===
On 12 December 1979, the Government appointed Ministers of State on the nomination of the Taoiseach.

Name	Department(s)
Seán Moore	Taoiseach (Government Chief Whip); Defence
Jackie Fahey	Environment
Jim Tunney	Education
Thomas Hussey	Agriculture
Ray Burke	Industry, Commerce and Tourism
Lorcan Allen	Agriculture
Ger Connolly	Environment
Tom McEllistrim	Finance
Seán Calleary	Public Service; Labour
Mark Killilea Jnr	Posts and Telegraphs
==== Changes 25 March 1980 ==== The number of Ministers of State was increased from 10 to 15 following the enactment of the Ministers and Secretaries (No.2) Act 1980.
Name	Department(s)
Thomas Meaney	Industry, Commerce and Tourism
Tom Nolan	Health; Social Welfare
Brendan Daly	Labour
Pádraig Flynn	Transport
Seán Doherty	Justice
==== Changes 15 October 1980 ==== Following the appointment of Ray Burke to cabinet.
Name	Department(s)
Denis Gallagher	Industry, Commerce and Tourism
==== Changes 17 December 1980 ==== Following the appointment of Tom Nolan to cabinet.
Name	Department(s)
Thomas Hussey	Health; Social Welfare
Michael Smith	Agriculture
