= Department of Agriculture, Food and the Marine =

Irish government department

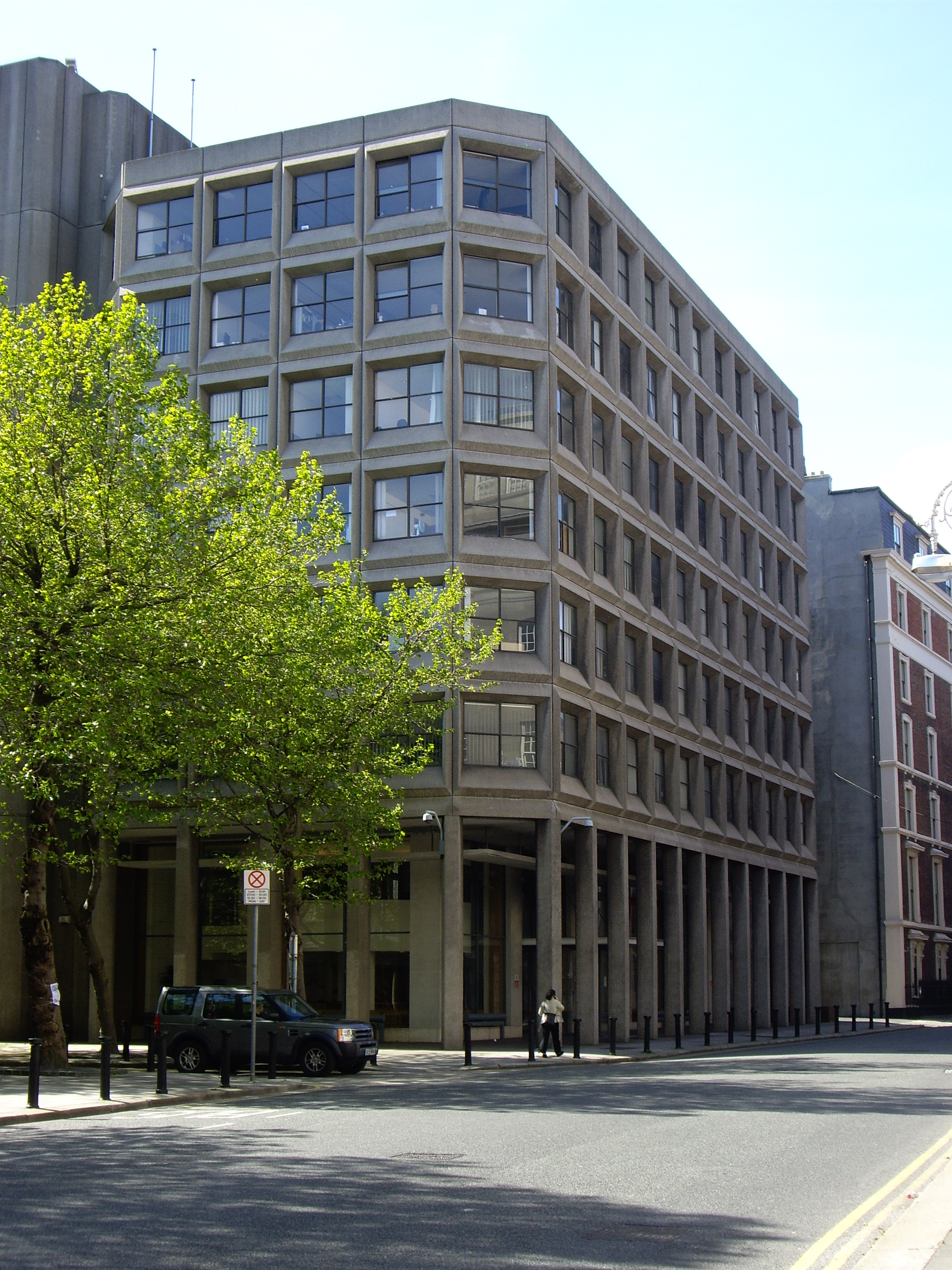
- Department headquarters

Department overview
- Formed: 2 April 1919
- Jurisdiction: Government of Ireland
- Headquarters: Agriculture House, Kildare Street, Dublin; 53°20′22″N 6°15′21″W
- Annual budget: €1.312 billion (2012)
- Minister responsible: Martin Heydon, Minister for Agriculture, Food and the Marine
- Department executive: Sinéad McPhillips, Secretary General
- Website: Official website

The Department of Agriculture, Food and the Marine (Irish: An Roinn Talmhaíochta, Bia, Iascaigh agus Mara) is a department of the Government of Ireland. According to the department, its mission is to "lead the sustainable development of a competitive, consumer focused agri-food sector and to contribute to a vibrant rural economy and society". It is led by the Minister for Agriculture, Food and the Marine.

== Departmental team ==
The official headquarters and ministerial offices of the department are in Agriculture House, Kildare Street, Dublin. The departmental team consists of the following:

- Minister for Agriculture, Food and the Marine: Martin Heydon, TD
  - Minister of State at the Department of Agriculture, Food and the Marine with special responsibility for food promotion, new markets, research and development: Noel Grealish, TD
  - Minister of State at the Department of Agriculture, Food and the Marine with special responsibility for the marine: Timmy Dooley, TD. Dooley is also a Minister of State at the Department of Climate, Energy and the Environment.
- Secretary General of the Department: Sinéad McPhillips

== Overview ==
The department has the following divisions:

- Seafood & Marine
- Chief Veterinary Officer, One Health, One Welfare
- Chief Inspector, Environment
- Chief Financial Officer, Governance
- Direct Payments Division
- Agri-Environment, Rural Development and Forestry
- HR and Corporate Affairs
- Chief Information Officer and Head of Operations, Information Management and Technology
- Agri-Food Sectoral Policy and Strategy Development
- Head of Laboratories, One Health
- EU/UK and International Affairs

In carrying out its mandate, the department undertakes a variety of functions including:

- Policy advice and development on all areas of departmental responsibility.
- Representation in international (especially European Union) and national negotiations.
- Development and implementation of national and EU schemes in support of agriculture, food, fisheries, forestry and rural development.
- Monitoring and controlling aspects of food safety.
- Control and audit of public expenditure under its control.
- Regulation of the agriculture, fisheries, food industries and forestry through national and EU law.
- Monitoring and controlling animal and plant health and animal welfare.
- Monitoring and direction of state bodies engaged in the following areas:
  - Research training and advice.
  - Market development and promotion.
  - Industry regulation and development.
  - Commercial activities.
- Direct provision of support services to agriculture, food, fisheries and forestry.

In 2017, Joe Healy, the Irish Farmers' Association president, expressed the view that since the UK is Ireland's main trading partner, Brexit could have a "frightening impact" on Ireland's agri-food sector. The UK was the market for 50 per cent, or 270,000 tonnes, of Irish beef exports and if the World Trade Organization (WTO) tariff rates were implemented they would "virtually wipe out" agri-food trade to Britain.

== Aegis bodies ==
The following bodies are under the aegis of the department:

- An Rialálaí Agraibhia (Agri-Food Regulator)
- Aquaculture Licences Appeals Board
- Bord Bia
- Greyhound Racing Ireland
- Bord Iascaigh Mhara
- Coillte
- Horse Racing Ireland
- Irish National Stud
- Marine Institute
- National Milk Agency
- Sea Fisheries Protection Authority (SFPA)
- Teagasc
- Veterinary Council of Ireland

== History ==
In 1899 the Department of Agriculture and Technical Instruction for Ireland (DATI) was established with Horace Plunkett as the department's first vice-president and T. P. Gill as its first Secretary.

The Department of Agriculture was created as a department of the Ministry of Dáil Éireann at one of the first meetings of Dáil Éireann in 1919 with Robert Barton as the first Minister for Agriculture.

It was given a statutory basis by the Ministers and Secretaries Act 1924. This act provided it with:

the administration and business generally of public services in connection with agriculture and lands, including the fixing of rents and tenure of lands, acquisition by occupying tenants of full ownership by means of public funds, enlargement and other economic improvement of holdings of land, purchase of land for distribution by way of re-sale, relief of rural congestion and like uneconomic conditions, promotion of agriculture by means of educational grants, and of lectures on special subjects, agricultural statistics, forestry, veterinary services, survey and mapping of land, and all powers, duties and functions connected with the same, and shall include in particular the business, powers, duties and functions of the branches and officers of the public services specified in the Fifth Part of the Schedule to this Act, and of which Department the head shall be, and shall be styled, an t-Aire Tailte agus Talmhaíochta or (in English) the Minister for Lands and Agriculture.

It assigned it with the following branches of administration:

- The Irish Land Commission (including the late Congested Districts Board for Ireland—Agricultural and Land Branches).
- The Department of Agriculture and Technical Instruction for Ireland (except the business and functions relating to Fisheries and Technical Instruction).
- The Ministry of Agriculture and Fisheries except so far as concerned with the Ordnance Survey.
- The Royal Veterinary College of Ireland.
- The Public Trustee in Ireland.
- The Forestry Commission.
- Farm Institutes of or controlled by Government.
- Royal Botanic Gardens.

=== Alteration of name and transfer of functions ===
Over the years its name and functions have changed several times.

Date	Change
2 June 1924	Establishment of the Department of Lands and Agriculture
22 July 1927	Transfer of Irish Land Commission to the Department of Fisheries
1 September 1928	Renamed as the Department of Agriculture
1 December 1933	Transfer of Forestry to the Department of Lands and Fisheries
1 April 1934	Transfer of Fisheries from the Department of Lands and Fisheries
9 April 1957	Transfer of Fisheries to the Department of Lands
3 May 1965	Transfer of Fisheries from the Department of Lands
6 July 1965	Renamed as the Department of Agriculture and Fisheries
8 February 1977	Transfer of Lands from the Department of Lands
8 February 1977	Transfer of Fisheries to the Department of Lands
9 February 1977	Renamed as the Department of Agriculture
31 March 1987	Renamed as the Department of Agriculture and Food
5 May 1987	Transfer of Food Standards from the Department of Industry and Commerce
10 January 1993	Transfer of Forestry from the Department of Energy
21 January 1993	Renamed as the Department of Agriculture, Food and Forestry
11 July 1997	Transfer of Forestry to the Department of the Marine
12 July 1997	Renamed as the Department of Agriculture and Food
27 September 1999	Renamed as the Department of Agriculture, Food and Rural Development
18 June 2002	Transfer of Rural Development to the Department of Arts, Heritage, Gaeltacht and the Islands
18 June 2002	Transfer of Horse and Greyhound Racing to the Department of Tourism, Sport and Recreation
19 June 2002	Renamed as the Department of Agriculture and Food
19 October 2007	Transfer of Fisheries from the Department of Communications, Marine and Natural Resources
20 October 2007	Renamed as the Department of Agriculture, Fisheries and Food
15 January 2010	Transfer of Foreshore to the Department of the Environment, Heritage and Local Government
1 May 2010	Transfer of Horse and Greyhound Racing from the Department of Arts, Sport and Tourism
1 May 2011	Transfer of Marine Tourism from the Department of Community, Equality and Gaeltacht Affairs
17 October 2011	Renamed as the Department of Agriculture, Food and the Marine
1 June 2025	Transfer of Dog control from the Department of Rural and Community Development
1 August 2025	Transfer of Dog breeding from the Department of Housing, Local Government and Heritage
