= Department of Justice, Home Affairs and Migration =

Irish government department

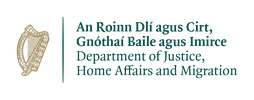

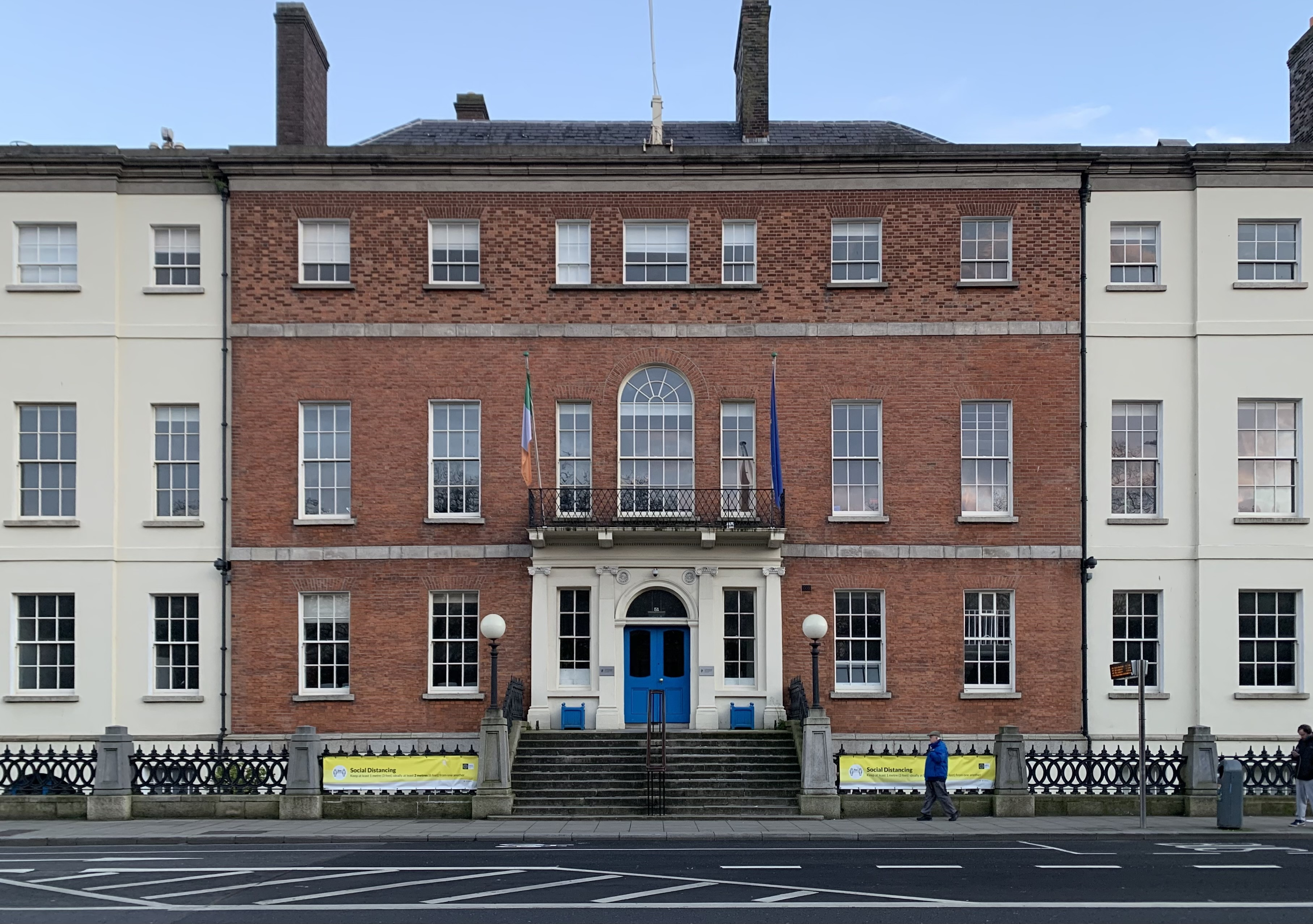
- Headquarters on St Stephen's Green

Department overview
- Formed: 22 January 1919
- Jurisdiction: Government of Ireland
- Headquarters: 51 St Stephen's Green, Dublin 2; 53°20′14″N 6°15′41″W
- Annual budget: €3.27 billion (2023-2024)
- Minister responsible: Jim O'Callaghan, Minister for Justice, Home Affairs and Migration
- Department executive: Doncha O'Sullivan, Secretary General
- Child agencies: Irish Prison Service; Criminal Assets Bureau; Courts Service; Garda Síochána
- Website: Official website

The Department of Justice, Home Affairs and Migration (Irish: An Roinn Dlí agus Cirt, Gnóthaí Baile agus Imirce) is a department of the Government of Ireland. It is led by the Minister for Justice, Home Affairs and Migration. The department is responsible for civil justice, criminal justice, social integration, immigration law and asylum law in Ireland.

== Departmental team ==
- Minister for Justice, Home Affairs and Migration: Jim O'Callaghan, TD
  - Minister of State with special responsibility for international law, law reform and youth justice: Niall Collins, TD
  - Minister of State with special responsibility for migration: Colm Brophy, TD
- Secretary General of the Department: Doncha O'Sullivan

== Overview ==
In July 2014 the department embarked on a comprehensive programme of change, including the recruitment of a new secretary-general following an independent review.

The headquarters and ministerial offices of the department are on St Stephen's Green, Dublin.

== Structure of the department ==
The department has the following divisions:

- Civil Justice
  - Legislation and Policy
  - Civil Governance
  - Immigration Service Delivery
  - International Protection Office
  - International Protection and Integration
  - Ukraine
- Finance
- Corporate
- Change, Technology and Innovation
- Transparency
- Head of European Affairs
- Criminal Justice
  - Criminal Justice Governance
  - Criminal Justice Legislation
  - Criminal Justice Policy
  - Security and Northern Ireland (including the National Cyber Security Centre)

== Responsibilities ==
The department's main areas of responsibility include:

- Implementing government policy on crime and protecting the security of the State (National Security Committee).
- Providing policy advice in relation to the criminal justice system (Garda Síochána, the Courts, Prisons and Probation and Welfare services) and supporting the operation of this system.
- Continuing reform of criminal law and certain areas of civil law.
- Playing a central part in the implementation of core elements in the Good Friday Agreement.
- Co-operating in relevant EU and international matters and promoting the Republic of Ireland's interests within the associated areas of responsibility.
- Implementing the Government's asylum strategy and further developing national immigration policy.

=== Immigration Service Delivery ===
Immigration Service Delivery (ISD) is an office of the department, previously named the Irish Naturalisation and Immigration Service (INIS), established in 2005 to deal with access to asylum, immigration, citizenship and visas. ISD is responsible for administering the administrative functions of the Minister for Justice, Home Affairs and Migration in relation to asylum, immigration (including visas) and citizenship matters. ISD also facilitates a whole of government approach to immigration and asylum issues which enables a more efficient service to be provided in these areas. It works with the Department of Enterprise, Tourism and Employment on the issuing of work permits.

ISD is structured around a number of key areas: asylum, visa, immigration and citizenship processing, asylum and immigration policy, repatriation and reception and integration. The agency also maintains close contact with the Garda National Immigration Bureau (GNIB) in relation to many aspects of its work including, deportations and illegal immigration. Members of the Garda Síochána of Detective rank, also carrying the seal of immigration officers, operate on a full-time basis within the head office in Burgh Quay. A Garda Immigration office is also maintained at all airports and main ports and at all Garda District Headquarters outside the Dublin Region.

Previously the responsibilities were shared between the Department of Justice and the Department of Foreign Affairs. It is located at 13/14 Burgh Quay, Dublin 2.

The Border Management Unit (BMU) is ISD's uniformed, front-line service providing Immigration Control at Dublin Airport. It was established as part of the Department of Justice's move to civilianize aspects of immigration management. The BMU gradually took over all front-line immigration control services from GNIB at Dublin Airport and is now solely responsible for these matters, with limited GNIB resources left at the airport for criminal investigations, detention services and removals of persons from the State. It is planned that the BMU will expand to take over front-line immigration at all Ports of Entry in the State.

== Aegis bodies ==
The following bodies are under the aegis of the department:

Statutory Bodies

- Garda Síochána
- Courts Service
- Criminal Assets Bureau
- Cuan, the Domestic, Sexual and Gender-Based Violence Agency Act
- Data Protection Commission
- Fiosrú – the Office of the Police Ombudsman
- Gambling Regulatory Authority of Ireland
- Insolvency Service of Ireland
- Judicial Appointments Commission
- Judicial Council
- Legal Aid Board
- Legal Services Regulatory Authority
- Mental Health (Criminal Law) Review Board
- Office of the Independent Examiner of Security Legislation
- Office of the Inspector of Prisons
- Parole Board
- Policing and Community Safety Authority
- Private Security Authority

Non-Statutory Bodies

- Criminal Injuries Compensation Tribunal
- Forensic Science Ireland
- Irish Prison Service
- Probation Service
- State Pathologist's Office

Other Statutory Office

- Coroners

Appellate Bodies (Statutory)

- International Protection Appeals Tribunal
- Private Security Appeal Board

== History ==
In the revolutionary period, the office was known as the Ministry of Home Affairs. The Ministers and Secretaries Act 1924, passed soon after the establishment of the Irish Free State in 1922, provided it with a statutory basis and renamed it as the Department of Justice. This act provided it with:

the administration and business generally of public services in connection with law, justice, public order and police, and all powers, duties and functions connected with the same (except such powers, duties and functions as are by law reserved to the Executive Council and such powers, duties and functions as are by the Constitution or by law excepted from the authority of the Executive Council or of an Executive Minister), and shall include in particular the business, powers, duties and functions of the branches and officers of the public service specified in the second part of the schedule to this Act, and of which Department the head shall be, and shall be styled, an t-Aire Dlí agus Cirt or (in English) the Minister for Justice.

The schedule assigned it with the following bodies:

- All Courts of Justice and the Offices thereof save in so far as the same are reserved to the Executive Council or are excepted from the authority of the Executive Council or of an Executive Minister.
- Police.
- The General Prisons Board for Ireland and all Prisons.
- The Registrar of District Court Clerks.
- The Public Record Office.
- The Registry of Deeds.
- The Land Registry.
- The Commissioners of Charitable Donations and Bequests for Ireland.

=== Alteration of name and transfer of functions ===
The name and functions of the department have changed by means of statutory instruments.

Date	Effect
2 June 1924	Establishment of the Department of Justice
1 January 1983	Transfer of Adoption to the Department of Health
3 February 1993	Transfer of Civil law reform, civil legal aid and the family mediation service to the Department of Equality and Law Reform
8 July 1997	Transfer of Equality and Law Reform from the Department of Equality and Law Reform
9 July 1997	Renamed as the Department of Justice, Equality and Law Reform
27 July 2001	Transfer of Charities to the Department of Social, Community and Family Affairs
1 June 2010	Transfer of Equality, Integration, Disability and Human Rights to the Department of Community, Rural and Gaeltacht Affairs
2 June 2010	Renamed as the Department of Justice and Law Reform
1 April 2011	Transfer of Equality, Integration, Disability and Human Rights from the Department of Community, Equality and Gaeltacht Affairs
2 April 2011	Renamed as the Department of Justice and Equality
1 May 2011	Transfer of Charities from the Department of Community, Equality and Gaeltacht Affairs
1 January 2013	Transfer of Equality Tribunal to the Department of Jobs, Enterprise and Innovation
19 June 2013	Transfer of Censorship of Publications to the Department of Arts, Heritage and the Gaeltacht
10 March 2015	Transfer of Censorship of Publications from the Department of Arts, Heritage and the Gaeltacht
1 January 2016	Transfer of Ordnance Survey Ireland from the Department of Communications, Climate Action and Environment
1 January 2016	Transfer of the Valuation Office from the Department of Public Expenditure and Reform
26 July 2017	Transfer of Charities to the Department of Rural and Community Development
1 January 2018	Transfer of Ordnance Survey Ireland to the Department of Housing, Planning and Local Government
1 January 2018	Transfer of Property Registration Authority to the Department of Housing, Planning and Local Government
1 January 2018	Transfer of Valuation Office to the Department of Housing, Planning and Local Government
14 October 2020	Transfer of Youth justice from the Department of Children and Youth Affairs
14 October 2020	Transfer of Disability, equality, human rights, integration and reception to the Department of Children and Youth Affairs
1 November 2020	Renamed as the Department of Justice
1 May 2025	Transfer of Integration and reception from the Department of Children, Equality, Disability, Integration and Youth
1 June 2025	Transfer of Cyber security from the Department of the Environment, Climate and Communications
5 June 2025	Renamed as the Department of Justice, Home Affairs and Migration
1 August 2025	Transfer of Property Services to the Department of Housing, Local Government and Heritage
1 August 2025	Transfer of Censorship of films and publications to the Department of Culture, Communications and Sport
