= Department of Children, Disability and Equality =

Irish government department

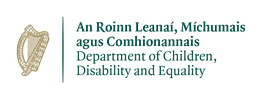

Department overview
- Formed: 2 June 1956
- Jurisdiction: Government of Ireland
- Headquarters: Miesian Plaza, Baggot Street, Dublin; 53°19′58″N 6°14′53″W
- Minister responsible: Norma Foley, Minister for Children, Disability and Equality
- Department executive: Kevin McCarthy, Secretary General
- Website: Official website

The Department of Children, Disability and Equality (Irish: An Roinn Leanaí, Míchumais agus Comhionannais) is a department of the Government of Ireland. It is led by the Minister for Children, Disability and Equality.

== Departmental team ==
The official headquarters and ministerial offices of the department are on Lower Baggot Street, Dublin. The departmental team consists of the following:

- Minister for Children, Disability and Equality: Norma Foley, TD
  - Minister of State at the Department of Children, Disability and Equality with special responsibility for disability: Emer Higgins, TD
- Secretary General of the Department: Kevin McCarthy

== Divisions ==
The department has the following divisions:

- Disability Division
- Early Learning and Care and School-Age Childcare Division
- Child Policy and Tusla Governance Division
- Equality, Rights and Participation Division
- Mother and Baby Homes, Finance and Research Division
- Organisation and Strategy Development Division

== Aegis bodies ==
The following bodies are under the aegis of the department:

- the Child and Family Agency, known as Tusla, established in January 2014 under the Child and Family Agency Act 2013
- the Adoption Authority of Ireland (AAI), established in November 2010 under the Adoption Act 2010
- the Ombudsman for Children's Office (OCO), established in 2004 under the Ombudsman for Children Act 2002
- the Oberstown Children Detention Campus, established under the Children Act 2001
- the National Disability Authority (NDA).

The Irish Human Rights and Equality Commission is an independent public body that accounts to the Oireachtas, with a mandate established under the Irish Human Rights and Equality Commission Act 2014.

The department also provides the primary source of funding for Gaisce – The President's Award. Gaisce is a limited company set up under the Companies Acts.

== History ==
The department was established under the Ministers and Secretaries (Amendment) Act 1956 as the Department of the Gaeltacht, an act of the 7th government of Ireland led by John A. Costello. This act provided its function as:

to promote the cultural, social and economic welfare of the Gaeltacht; to encourage the preservation and extension of the use of Irish as a vernacular language; and, to such extent as may be necessary or appropriate, to consult and advise with other Departments of State in respect of services administered by such Departments which affect the cultural, social or economic welfare of the Gaeltacht or which concern the national aim of restoring the Irish language.

The name and functions of the department have changed several times by means of statutory instruments. The department responsible for the Gaeltacht since 2025 is the Department of Rural and Community Development and the Gaeltacht. The Department of Children, Disability and Equality has had its current title and functions since 2025.

=== Alteration of name and transfer of functions ===
Date	Change
2 July 1956	Establishment of the Department of the Gaeltacht
15 October 1956	Transfer of Rural industry and Gaeltacht Housing from the Department of Lands
30 November 1956	Transfer of Oifig na Gaeltachta agus na gCeantar gCúng from the Department of Local Government
20 January 1993	Transfer of Broadcasting from the Department of Tourism, Transport and Communications
20 January 1993	Transfer of Arts and Culture from the Department of the Taoiseach
20 January 1993	Renamed as the Department of Arts, Culture and the Gaeltacht
10 April 1995	Allocation of Heritage
12 July 1997	Renamed as the Department of Arts, Heritage, Gaeltacht and the Islands
28 July 1997	Transfer of Aran Islands Transport from the Department of the Taoiseach
8 April 1998	Statutory statement of functions
13 December 2000	Transfer of Placenames from the Department of Finance
18 June 2002	Transfer of Broadcasting to the Department of Marine and Natural Resources
18 June 2002	Transfer of Arts and Culture to the Department of Tourism, Sport and Recreation
19 June 2002	Renamed as the Department of Community, Rural and Gaeltacht Affairs
25 June 2002	Transfer of Community Affairs from the Department of Social and Family Affairs
10 July 2002	Transfer of Heritage to the Department of the Environment and Local Government
16 December 2003	Statutory statement of functions
9 July 2007	Statutory statement of functions
1 June 2010	Transfer of Equality, Integration, Disability and Human Rights from the Department of Justice, Equality and Law Reform
2 June 2010	Renamed as the Department of Community, Equality and Gaeltacht Affairs
1 April 2011	Transfer of Equality, Integration, Disability and Human Rights to the Department of Justice and Law Reform
1 May 2011	Transfer of Irish Language, Gaeltacht and the Islands to the Department of Tourism, Culture and Sport
1 May 2011	Transfer of Social Inclusion to the Department of Social Protection
1 May 2011	Transfer of the National Drugs Strategy to the Department of Health and Children
1 May 2011	Transfer of Inland Waterways to the Department of Tourism, Culture and Sport
1 May 2011	Transfer of Community Affairs to the Department of the Environment, Heritage and Local Government
11 May 2011	Transfer of the Education Welfare from the Department of Education and Skills
1 June 2011	Transfer of Gaeltacht Planning to the Department of Tourism, Culture and Sport
2 June 2011	Renamed as the Department of Children and Youth Affairs
3 June 2011	Transfer of Children and Youth Affairs from the Department of Health and Children
1 October 2011	Transfer of Child Care from the Department of Health
1 January 2012	Transfer of Remand Centres and Children Detention Schools from the Department of Justice and Equality
14 October 2020	Transfer of Youth Justice to the Department of Justice and Equality
14 October 2020	Transfer of Disability, Equality, Human Rights, Integration and Reception from the Department of Justice and Equality
15 October 2020	Renamed as the Department of Children, Equality, Disability, Integration and Youth
1 January 2021	Transfer of Education Welfare to the Department of Education
15 December 2021	Transfer of Oversight of Education Welfare to the Department of Education
1 March 2023	Transfer of Specialist Community-Based Disability Services from the Department of Health
1 May 2025	Transfer of Integration and Reception to the Department of Justice
1 May 2025	Transfer of Youth to the Department of Education
2 May 2025	Renamed as the Department of Children, Disability and Equality
