= Department of Climate, Energy and the Environment =

Irish government department

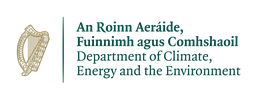

Department overview
- Formed: 26 August 1921
- Jurisdiction: Government of Ireland
- Headquarters: Tom Johnson House, Haddington Road, Dublin; 53.335849°N 6.234909°W
- Employees: 500
- Minister responsible: Darragh O'Brien, Minister for Climate, Energy and the Environment
- Department executive: Oonagh Buckley, Secretary General
- Website: Official website

The Department of Climate, Energy and the Environment (Irish: An Roinn Aeráide, Fuinnimh agus Comhshaoil) is a department of the government of Ireland that is responsible for environmental policy, energy policy, and protects and develops the natural resources of Ireland. The department is led by the Minister for Climate, Energy and the Environment.

== Departmental team ==
The headquarters and ministerial offices are at Tom Johnson House, Beggar's Bush, Dublin. The departmental team consists of the following:

- Minister for Climate, Energy and the Environment: Darragh O'Brien, TD. O'Brien is also Minister for Transport.
  - Minister of State at the Department of Climate, Energy and the Environment with special responsibility for the circular economy: Alan Dillon, TD
  - Minister of State at the Department of Climate, Energy and the Environment with special responsibility for the marine: Timmy Dooley, TD. Dooley is also a Minister of State at the Department of Agriculture, Food and the Marine.
- Secretary General of the Department: Oonagh Buckley

== Structure ==
The department has the following divisions:

- Grid and Strategy
- Climate Action and Environment Policy
- Security of Supply and Generation
- Corporate Affairs and Strategic Development
- Chief Audit Officer
- Circular Economy and Resource Efficiency (includes the Geological Survey of Ireland)
- Demand, Energy Affordability and Competitiveness
- EU, International and Marine Affairs

== Aegis bodies ==
The following bodies are under the aegis of the department:

=== Energy ===
- Bord na Móna
- Electricity Supply Board
- EirGrid
- Commission for Regulation of Utilities
- National Oil Reserves Agency
- Sustainable Energy Authority of Ireland
- Irish National Petroleum Corporation

=== Climate Action and Environment ===
- Environmental Protection Agency

=== Natural Resources ===
- Inland Fisheries Ireland
- Loughs Agency, part of the Foyle, Carlingford and Irish Lights Commission
- Maritime Area Regulatory Authority
- Mining Board

== History ==
The Department of Fisheries was created in 1921 during the Ministry of Dáil Éireann. It was given a statutory basis by the Ministers and Secretaries Act 1924, soon after the establishment of the Irish Free State in 1922. This act provided it with:

the administration and business generally of public services in connection with fisheries, including deep-sea fisheries, tidal waters fisheries, coastal fisheries, inland waters fisheries, and industries connected with or auxiliary to the same, and all powers duties and functions connected with the same, and shall include in particular the business powers, duties and functions of the branches and officers of the public services specified in the Seventh Part of the Schedule to this Act, and of which Department the head shall be, and shall be styled, an t-Aire Iascaigh or (in English) the Minister for Fisheries.

The Schedule assigned it with the duties of the following bodies:

- Department of Agriculture and Technical Instruction for Ireland — Fisheries Branch.
- Congested Districts Board for Ireland — Fisheries Branch, and Rural Industries Branch.
- The Conservators of Fisheries.

=== Alteration of name and transfer of functions ===
The name and functions of the department have changed several times by statutory instruments.

| Date | Change |
|---|---|
| 2 June 1924 | Establishment of the Department of Fisheries |
| 22 July 1927 | Transfer of Irish Land Commission from the Department of Agriculture |
| 1 September 1928 | Renamed as the Department of Lands and Fisheries |
| 1 December 1933 | Transfer of Forestry from the Department of Agriculture |
| 1 April 1934 | Renamed as the Department of Lands; Transfer of Fisheries to the Department of Agriculture |
| 9 April 1957 | Transfer of Fisheries from the Department of Agriculture |
| 3 May 1965 | Transfer of Fisheries to the Department of Agriculture |
| 8 February 1977 | Transfer of Lands to the Department of Agriculture and Fisheries |
| 8 February 1977 | Transfer of Fisheries from the Department of Agriculture and Fisheries |
| 9 February 1977 | Renamed as the Department of Fisheries |
| 19 February 1978 | Renamed as the Department of Fisheries and Forestry |
| 18 February 1986 | Transfer of Tourism from the Department of Industry, Trade, Commerce and Tourism |
| 18 February 1986 | Renamed as the Department of Tourism, Fisheries and Forestry |
| 19 March 1987 | Renamed as the Department of the Marine |
| 31 March 1987 | Transfer of Shipping from the Department of Communications |
| 31 March 1987 | Transfer of Tourism to the Department of Tourism and Transport |
| 31 March 1987 | Transfer of Forestry and Wildlife to the Department of Energy |
| 11 July 1997 | Transfer of Forestry from the Department of Agriculture, Food and Forestry |
| 12 July 1997 | Renamed as the Department of the Marine and Natural Resources |
| 15 July 1997 | Transfer of Mining from the Department of Public Enterprise |
| 1 October 1997 | Transfer of Offshore Exploration from the Department of Public Enterprise |
| 18 June 2002 | Transfer of Broadcasting from the Department of Arts, Heritage, Gaeltacht and the Islands |
| 18 June 2002 | Transfer of Communications from the Department of Public Enterprise |
| 19 June 2002 | Renamed as the Department of Communications, Marine and Natural Resources |
| 1 January 2004 | Transfer of Forestry to Department of Agriculture and Food |
| 19 October 2007 | Transfer of Fisheries to Department of Agriculture and Food |
| 20 October 2007 | Renamed as the Department of Communications, Energy and Natural Resources |
| 1 January 2008 | Transfer of Ordnance Survey Ireland from the Department of Finance |
| 1 January 2016 | Transfer of Ordnance Survey Ireland to the Department of Justice and Equality |
| 22 July 2016 | Transfer of Climate Action and Environment from the Department of the Environment, Community and Local Government |
| 23 July 2016 | Renamed as the Department of Communications, Climate Action and Environment |
| 23 September 2020 | Transfer of Broadcasting to the Department of Culture, Heritage and the Gaeltacht |
| 24 September 2020 | Renamed as the Department of the Environment, Climate and Communications |
| 1 June 2025 | Transfer of Cyber security to the Department of Justice |
| 1 June 2025 | Transfer of Telecommunications to the Department of Tourism, Culture, Arts, Gaeltacht, Sport and Media |
| 2 June 2025 | Renamed as the Department of Climate, Energy and the Environment |
| 1 August 2025 | Transfer of Marine environment from the Department of Housing, Local Government and Heritage |
