= Department of state (Ireland) =

Department or ministry of the Government of Ireland

In Ireland, a department of state (Irish: Roinn Stáit) is a department or ministry of the Government of Ireland. The head of such a department is a minister termed a minister of the government; prior to 1977 such ministers were called ministers of state, a term now used for junior (non-cabinet) ministers.

Most members of the government are Ministers of the Government, though there may occasionally be a minister without portfolio who does not head a department of state. The law regarding the departments of state and ministers of the government is based in the Constitution of Ireland, primarily in Article 28; legislative detail is given in the Ministers and Secretaries Acts 1924 to 2020.

== Overview ==
There are eighteen individual departments of state in the Irish Government. Each department is led by a Minister of the Government, who is appointed by the President on the nomination of the Taoiseach and approval of Dáil Éireann, and cover matters that require direct political oversight. For all departments, the Minister in question is known as Minister for … and is a member of the cabinet, formally known as the Government of Ireland; a cabinet-level minister without a department is called a minister without portfolio, though the only permanent appointment on this basis was during The Emergency, between 1939 and 1945. A Minister of the Government is usually supported by one or more Ministers of State, also known as junior ministers, and may delegate powers to these ministers in accordance with law.

Under the Constitution, there may be no fewer than seven, and no more than fifteen members of the cabinet. Three of the current fifteen ministers are responsible for two departments each.

A Minister of the Government has the power to suggest and propose new or amended legislation to the Government relating to matters that arise in their own department. Ministers are also entitled to make statutory instruments, also known as delegated or secondary legislation. Statutory instruments allow the minister to give effect to or implement legislation without passage through the Oireachtas. Statutory instruments do not have to be approved by the Oireachtas, although they may be cancelled by either the Dáil or the Seanad and may not supplant the role of primary legislation.

Each department of state has a permanent staff that remains in office regardless of changes in government or the Oireachtas. The departments' staff are described as the civil service. The administrative management of the department is led by a senior civil servant known as a secretary-general. These officials advise and assist the minister in the running of the department.

The names and functions of the separate departments of states have in some cases changed significantly from their creation. The transfer of functions between departments usually occurs on the formation of a new government by an incoming Taoiseach, but can be done at any stage, such as during a cabinet reshuffle. The Department of Public Expenditure, Infrastructure, Public Service Reform and Digitalisation has created guidelines of best practice for the management of these transfers.

== List of departments of state ==
Current departments of state, listed under their present title.

Department of state	Creation	Incumbent Minister	Ministerial Office
Agriculture, Food and the Marine	1919	Martin Heydon	Agriculture, Food and the Marine
Defence	1919	Helen McEntee	Defence
Finance	1919	Simon Harris	Finance
Foreign Affairs and Trade	1919	Helen McEntee	Foreign Affairs and Trade
Enterprise, Tourism and Employment	1919	Peter Burke	Enterprise, Tourism and Employment
Housing, Local Government and Heritage	1919	James Browne	Housing, Local Government and Heritage
Justice, Home Affairs and Migration	1919	Jim O'Callaghan	Justice, Home Affairs and Migration
Education and Youth	1921	Hildegarde Naughton	Education and Youth
Climate, Energy and the Environment	1921	Darragh O'Brien	Climate, Energy and the Environment
Taoiseach	1924	Micheál Martin	Taoiseach
Health	1947	Jennifer Carroll MacNeill	Health
Social Protection	1947	Dara Calleary	Social Protection
Children, Disability and Equality	1956	Norma Foley	Children, Disability and Equality
Transport	1973	Darragh O'Brien	Transport
Culture, Communications and Sport	1977	Patrick O'Donovan	Culture, Communications and Sport
Public Expenditure, Infrastructure, Public Service Reform and Digitalisation	2011	Jack Chambers	Public Expenditure, Infrastructure, Public Service Reform and Digitalisation
Rural and Community Development and the Gaeltacht	2017	Dara Calleary	Rural and Community Development and the Gaeltacht
Further and Higher Education, Research, Innovation and Science	2020	James Lawless	Further and Higher Education, Research, Innovation and Science

=== Past Departments of state, listed under their final title ===
Department of state	Operation	Functions transferred to
Department of Posts and Telegraphs	1922–1984	Department of Communications
Department of Supplies	1939–1945	Department of Industry and Commerce
Department of Transport	1959–1984	Department of Communications
Department of Equality and Law Reform	1966–1997	Department of Justice, Equality and Law Reform
Department of Communications	1984–1991	Department of Tourism, Transport and Communications

- Note: Frank Aiken served as Minister for the Co-ordination of Defensive Measures from 1939 to 1945 during the Emergency. In this capacity, he was a minister without portfolio as there was no corresponding Department of state.
