= Irish Film & Television Academy =

All-Ireland organisation focused on film and television

IFTA Academy Ltd
- Abbreviation: IFTA
- Headquarters: 68 Dame Street, Dublin 2, Ireland
- Subsidiaries: John Ford Ireland
- Website: www.ifta.ie

The Irish Film & Television Academy (IFTA; Irish: Acadamh Scannán agus Teilifíse na hÉireann) is an all-Ireland organisation focused on film and television. It has about 1000 members, and is based in Dublin, with branches in London and Los Angeles. The IFTA now holds separate ceremonies for the IFTA Film & Drama Awards and IFTA Gala Television Awards; Before 2015, they were one ceremony, known as the Irish Film & Television Awards. IFTA also holds the John Ford Ireland Symposium each June and over 30 networking and learning events throughout the year.

IFTA also established John Ford Ireland in 2011, in association with the estate of American director John Ford and the Department of Culture, Heritage, and the Gaeltacht.

== See also ==
- Jacob's Awards
