= Department of Education and Skills =

Department of Education and Skills may refer to:

- Department of Education and Youth, a government department in Ireland, formerly called the Department of Education and Skills
- Department for Education and Skills (United Kingdom), a government department in the United Kingdom from 2001 to 2007
