= Garda National Immigration Bureau =

Irish police unit

The Garda National Immigration Bureau (GNIB; Irish: Biúró Náisiúnta an Gharda Síochána um Inimirce) is a unit of the Garda Síochána, the police force of Ireland. It was formed in May 2000 and is responsible for the enforcement of immigration law in Ireland.

== Formation and duties ==
The GNIB was formed in May 2000, and is responsible for the execution of deportation orders, investigation of human trafficking complaints, investigation of language schools, countering illegal immigration and border control. It also provides support and assistance to local Garda immigration officers throughout the country.

It operates immigration checkpoints at Irish airports and ports, except at Dublin Airport, where the facilities are operated by the Irish Naturalisation and Immigration Service.

While Garda officers also previously handled administrative tasks like registering people and issuing residence permits, these duties were transferred to civilian staff at Immigration Service Delivery (ISD), formerly the Irish Naturalisation and Immigration Service (INIS), on 13 January 2025, with the Minister for Justice stating that she was 'committed to civilianising administrative functions within An Garda Síochána' to allow Gardaí to focus on enforcement duties such as deportations and investigations, and to modernise immigration services, including online renewals in counties such as Cork and Limerick.

== Organisation ==
The GNIB is headquartered at Burgh Quay in Dublin 2, and reports to the Assistant Commissioner with responsibility for Special Crime Operations. As of 2010, its staff included two Detective Superintendents, four Detective Inspectors, 24 Detective Sergeants, 180 Detective Gardaí and Gardaí, and 68 civilian staff.

The Minister for Justice, Home Affairs and Migration has responsibility for both the Irish Naturalisation and Immigration Service and the Garda National Immigration Bureau. This oversight is intended to ensure coordination between the police force's enforcement duties and the civilian-led administrative functions of the national immigration system.
