= Private Security Authority =

The Private Security Authority
- An tÚdarás Slándála Prı́obháidı́

Agency overview
- Formed: 29 October 2004
- Type: Statutory authority
- Jurisdiction: Ireland
- Headquarters: Davis Street, Tipperary
- Minister responsible: Jim O'Callaghan, TD, Minister for Justice, Home Affairs and Migration
- Agency executives: vacant, Chief Executive; Noel Lappin, Chairman
- Parent department: Department of Justice, Home Affairs and Migration
- Key document: Private Security Services Act 2004
- Website: www.psa.gov.ie

The Private Security Authority (PSA) (Irish: An tÚdarás Slándála Prı́obháidı́) is an independent statutory body in Ireland that regulates private security services. It was established under the Private Security Services Act 2004. It is responsible for the protection of the public and clients of the security industry by promoting a high quality standards-based licensing system for businesses and individuals working in the industry.

== Functions ==
- Control and supervision of persons providing security services and improving standards.
- Granting, renewing, suspending and revoking of licences.
- Establishing and maintaining a register of licensees.
- Issuing identity cards to licensees which must be on view when working.
- Specifying qualifications, standards or requirements for the granting of licences.
- Undertaking or commissioning research activities necessary for the planning, development and provision of those services.
- Establishing and maintaining a register of licensees.
- Specifying standards to be observed in the provision of security services.
- Administering a system of investigation and adjudication of complaints.
- Advising the Minister for Justice, Home Affairs and Migration and keeping the Minister informed of developments that would assist in developing policy.

== Sectors regulated ==
- Door supervisor,
- Installer of Electronic Security Equipment,
- Security Guard,
- Providers of Protected forms of Transport,
- Locksmiths,
- Supplier and Installers of Safes,
- Private Investigators, and
- Security Consultants.

These sectors are further divided to include event security and monitoring of intruder alarm and CCTV equipment.

== Register ==
It maintains a register of licensed providers of security services and a register of licensed employees and the services for which they are licensed to provide.
