= Courts Service =

Government agency of Ireland

- An tSéirbhís Chúirteanna

Agency overview
- Formed: November 1999
- Jurisdiction: Ireland
- Headquarters: Phoenix House, 15 - 24 Phoenix Street North, Smithfield, Dublin 7, Ireland; 53.346871°N 6.277765°W
- Employees: 1,025
- Annual budget: €133 million (2017)
- Agency executives: Angela Denning, Chief Executive Officer; Chief Justice Donal O'Donnell, Chairperson
- Website: courts.ie

The Courts Service is a statutory body that provides administration and support services to the Courts of the Republic of Ireland. It was established in 1999 by the Courts Service Act 1998. Its head office is at Phoenix House, Smithfield, Dublin.

== Functions ==
The Courts Service Act 1998 assigns the Courts Service the following functions:

- managing the courts,
- providing support services for the judges,
- providing information on the courts system to the public,
- providing, managing and maintaining court buildings, and
- providing facilities for users of the courts.

The Court Service has no function in relation to the actual administration of justice. Judges themselves are directly employed by the state and not by the Courts Service.

== Corporate structure ==
The day-to-day management of the Courts Service is conducted by its chief executive officer who is appointed by the Board of the Courts Service. The Board of the Courts Service is made up of the following:

- the presidents of the Supreme Court, the Court of Appeal, the High Court, the Circuit Court and the District Court (or judges of those courts nominated by their presidents),
- members of each of these five courts elected by their ordinary members,
- the chief executive officer of the Courts Service and a representative of its staff elected by them,
- a practicing barrister and a practicing solicitor nominated by the chairman of the Bar Council and the president of the Law Society of Ireland respectively,
- a civil servant from the Department of Justice, Home Affairs and Migration nominated by the Minister for Justice, Home Affairs and Migration,
- a person nominated by the Irish Congress of Trade Unions,
- a person nominated by the Minister to represent the consumers of court services, and
- a person nominated by the Minister for relevant knowledge and experience in commerce, finance or administration.

== See also ==
- Law of the Republic of Ireland
