= Social security in the Republic of Ireland =

In Ireland, there are two categories of social security, contributory (social insurance), and non-contributory (social assistance), as well as three main types of payments:

- Social insurance payments
- Means-tested payments
- Universal payments

All benefits are administered by the Department of Social Protection, which is divided into two parts, the Aireacht which is responsible for "policy formulation, legislations and general administration" and Social Welfare Services which is responsible for the "day-to-day running and delivery of services" of the department.

== Social Assistance ==
In order to qualify for social assistance, the applicant must undergo a means test and a habitual residence test.

Social assistance programs include:

- Back to Work Family Dividend
- Blind Pension
- Carer's Allowance
- Child Benefit
- Disability Allowance
- Domiciliary Care Allowance
- Guardian's and orphan's Payment (Non-Contributory)
- Jobseeker's Allowance and Jobseeker's Allowance Transitional payment
- One-Parent Family Payment
- State Pension (Non-Contributory)
- Supplementary Welfare Allowance
- Widow's, Widower's or Surviving Civil Partner's (Non-Contributory) Pension

== State Pension (Contributory) ==
The state pension (contributory) falls under the social insurance category. To be eligible, you need to have

- been making Pay Related Social Insurance contributions before the age of 56
- have made three years worth of contributions if the pensioner reached pension age before 6 April 2002, have made five years worth of contributions if the pensioner reached pension age between 6 April 2002 and 5 April 2012, have made 10 years of contributions if the pensioner reached pension age after 6 April 2012
- have made enough contributions per year if the pensioner reached pension age on or before 1 September 2012, or have made enough contributions total if the pensioner reached pension age after 1 September 2012

The payments for those who qualified on or before the 1st of September, 2012 are:

Average Number of Contributions per Year	Pay Per Week	Increase for an adult dependent (under 66)	Increase for an adult dependent (over 66)
10-14	€99.20	€65.70	€89.50
15-19	€161.80	€107.80	€144.50
20-29	€211.40	€140.10	€188.70
30-39	€223.20	€149.80	€200.50
40-47	€243.40	€157.40	€211.40
48 and above	€248.30	€165.40	€222.50

The payments for those who qualified after the 1st of September, 2012 are:

Average Number of Contributions per Year	Pay Per Week	Increase for an adult dependent (under 66)	Increase for an adult dependent (over 66)
10-14	€124.20	€82.80	€111.20
15-19	€186.20	€124.10	€166.90
20-47	€243.40	€165.40	€222.50
48 and above	€248.30	€165.40	€222.50

The pensioner also receives an additional €10 once they reach 80 years of age, and may be eligible for other benefits.

== State Pension (Non-Contributory) ==
The State Pension (Non-Contributory) falls under the social assistance category. It provides payments to those over 66 who did not make enough payments for State Pension (Contributory). To be eligible, a pensioner must:

- be 66 years or older
- not be on the State Pension (Contributory)
- pass a means and habitual residence test

== Disability ==
People who have paid sufficient Pay Related Social Insurance into the national Social Insurance Fund may qualify for Illness Benefit for one or two years. They may then qualify for Invalidity Pension, which can continue until age 66.

Injury Benefit and Disablement Benefit may be payable to people disabled as a result of an accident at work or a prescribed disease contracted at work.

Disability Allowance is payable to disabled people over 16 and under 66 years of age. The disability must have continued, or be expected to continue, for at least 12 months. It must cause substantial restrictions in undertaking work that would otherwise be suitable for a person of your age, experience and qualifications.

== Supplementary Welfare Allowance ==
Supplementary Welfare Allowance is paid to people whose income is less than the rate judged sufficient for their family. This is subject to a means test.

== Widows and widowers ==
May be eligible for Widow's/Widower's (Contributory) Pension (Pinsean Ranníocach Baintrí (Fir agus Mná)), the Bereavement Grant (Deontas Báis), the Widowed Parents Grant (Deontas Báis Bhaintrí/Bhaintrí Fir) and/or the Special Funeral Grant (Deontas Speiseálta Sochraide).

Payments for the Widow's/Widower's Pension are as follows:

Age	Payment per week	Payment from January 2008
Under 66	€191.30	€203.30
66 - 79	€209.30	€223.30
Over 80	€219.30	€233.30

For each child dependant, €22.00 (€24.00 from January 2008) is added.

More information on the Widow's/Widower's Pension scheme can be found here.

The Bereavement Grant is a simple one-off payment of €850, given after a death to the deceased's family. More information can be found here and here.

The Widowed Parents Grant is a one-off payment of €6,000, given to widows/widowers with one or more child dependants living with them. However, there are other rules regarding the payment; more information can be found here.

The Special Funeral Grant is another one-off payment of €850, given to the deceased's family. It is only available if the person dies at work. More information can be found here.
