= Department of Culture, Communications and Sport =

Irish government department

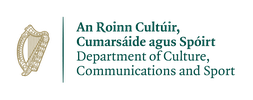

Department overview
- Formed: 8 July 1977
- Jurisdiction: Government of Ireland
- Headquarters: Leeson Lane, Dublin; 53°20′10″N 6°15′19″W
- Minister responsible: Peter Burke, Minister for Culture, Communications and Sport
- Department executive: Feargal Ó Coigligh, Secretary General
- Website: Official website

The Department of Culture, Communications and Sport (Irish: An Roinn Cultúir, Cumarsáide agus Spóirt) is a department of the Government of Ireland. It is led by the Minister for Culture, Communications and Sport.

== Departmental team ==
The headquarters and ministerial offices of the department are on Leeson Lane, Dublin. The department also has offices on New Road, Killarney, County Kerry. The departmental team consists of the following:

- Minister for Culture, Communications and Sport: Peter Burke, TD
  - Minister of State at the Department of Culture, Communications and Sport with special responsibility for sport and postal policy: Charlie McConalogue, TD
- Secretary General of the Department: Feargal Ó Coigligh

== Divisions ==
The department has the following divisions:

- Sports
- Culture
- Corporate Affairs
- Media and Broadcasting
- Communications

== Aegis bodies ==
The following state bodies and agencies are under the aegis of the department:

=== Arts and culture ===
- Arts Council of Ireland (which acts as the Cultural Contact Point to access EU cultural programme funding)
- Chester Beatty Library
- Crawford Art Gallery
- Irish Museum of Modern Art
- Irish Manuscripts Commission
- National Archives of Ireland
- National Concert Hall
- National Gallery of Ireland
- National Library of Ireland
- National Museum of Ireland
- Screen Ireland

=== Sport ===
- Sport Ireland

=== Media and Broadcasting ===
- Coimisiún na Meán
- RTÉ
- Teilifís na Gaeilge
- Irish Film Classification Office

=== Communication ===
- An Post
- Commission for Communications Regulation
- Digital Hub Development Agency

== History ==
The department was created by the Ministers and Secretaries (Amendment) Act 1977 as the Department of Economic Planning and Development, an act of the 15th government of Ireland led by Jack Lynch. This act provided its function as:

(a) to promote and coordinate economic and social planning for the development of the economy both generally and as respects different sectors thereof and different regions of the country,

(b) to identify the policies it considers necessary for general economic and social development and to report thereon to the Government,

(c) to identify in consultation with Departments of State and to review and appraise the plans and activities of such Departments giving effect to the policies for general economic and social development adopted by the Government,

(d) to make proposals to the Government for the coordination of the plans and activities referred to in paragraph (c) of this subsection and for their integration with national economic and social plans and

(e) to review the implementation of such national economic and social plans as may be approved by the Government from time to time and to report thereon to the Government.

Over the years the name and functions of the department have changed several times.

Date	Change
13 December 1977	Establishment of the Department of Economic Planning and Development
1 January 1980	Transfer of Economic Planning to the Department of Finance
21 January 1980	Renamed as the Department of Energy
22 January 1980	Transfer of Energy from the Department of Industry, Commerce and Energy
20 August 1981	Transfer of Industry from the Department of Industry, Commerce and Tourism
21 August 1981	Renamed as the Department of Industry and Energy
16 December 1983	Transfer of Industry to the Department of Trade, Commerce and Tourism
17 December 1983	Renamed as the Department of Energy
20 January 1993	Transfer of Forestry to the Department of Agriculture and Food
20 January 1993	Transfer of Trade from the Department of Industry and Commerce
20 January 1993	Transfer of Tourism from the Department of Tourism, Transport and Communications
20 January 1993	Renamed as the Department of Tourism and Trade
21 January 1993	Transfer of Energy to the Department of Tourism, Transport and Communications
11 July 1997	Transfer of Trade to the Department of Enterprise and Employment
12 July 1997	Renamed as the Department of Tourism, Sport and Recreation
18 June 2002	Transfer of Horse and Greyhound Racing from the Department of Agriculture, Food and Rural Development
18 June 2002	Transfer of Arts and Culture from the Department of Arts, Heritage, Gaeltacht and the Islands
19 June 2002	Renamed as the Department of Arts, Sport and Tourism
25 June 2002	Transfer of the Genealogical Office from the Department of Education and Science
10 July 2002	Transfer of National Monuments from the Department of Community, Rural and Gaeltacht Affairs
1 May 2010	Transfer of Horse and Greyhound Racing to the Department of Agriculture, Fisheries and Food
2 May 2010	Renamed as the Department of Tourism, Culture and Sport
1 April 2011	Transfer of Tourism and Sport to the Department of Transport
1 May 2011	Transfer of Irish Language, Gaeltacht and the Islands from the Department of Community, Equality and Gaeltacht Affairs
1 May 2011	Transfer of Heritage from the Department of the Environment, Heritage and Local Government
1 May 2011	Transfer of Inland Waterways from the Department of Community, Equality and Gaeltacht Affairs
1 June 2011	Transfer of Gaeltacht Planning from the Department of Community, Equality and Gaeltacht Affairs
1 June 2011	Transfer of Tourism and Sport to the Department of Transport, Tourism and Sport
2 June 2011	Renamed as the Department of Arts, Heritage and the Gaeltacht
19 June 2013	Transfer of Censorship of Publications from the Department of Justice and Equality
10 March 2015	Transfer of Censorship of Publications to the Department of Justice and Equality
9 June 2016	Transfer of Rural Affairs from the Department of the Environment, Community and Local Government
7 July 2016	Renamed as the Department of Arts, Heritage, Regional, Rural and Gaeltacht Affairs
27 July 2017	Transfer of Rural Affairs to the Department of Rural and Community Development
1 August 2017	Renamed as the Department of Culture, Heritage and the Gaeltacht
9 September 2020	Transfer of Heritage to the Department of Housing, Planning and Local Government
9 September 2020	Transfer of Inland Waterways to the Department of Housing, Planning and Local Government
16 September 2020	Transfer of Tourism and Sport from the Department of Transport, Tourism and Sport
22 September 2020	Transfer of Broadcasting from the Department of Communications, Climate Action and Environment
23 September 2020	Transfer of Islands to the Department of Rural and Community Development
30 September 2020	Renamed as the Department of Tourism, Culture, Arts, Gaeltacht, Sport and Media
31 March 2021	Transfer of Heritage Fund from the Department of Housing, Local Government and Heritage
1 June 2025	Transfer of Tourism to the Department of Enterprise, Trade and Employment
1 June 2025	Transfer of Irish Language and the Gaeltacht to the Department of Rural and Community Development
1 June 2025	Transfer of Telecommunications from the Department of the Environment, Climate and Communications
2 June 2025	Renamed as the Department of Culture, Communications and Sport
1 August 2025	Transfer of Censorship of films and publications from the Department of Justice, Home Affairs and Migration
