= Department of Education and Youth =

Irish government department

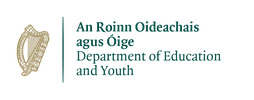

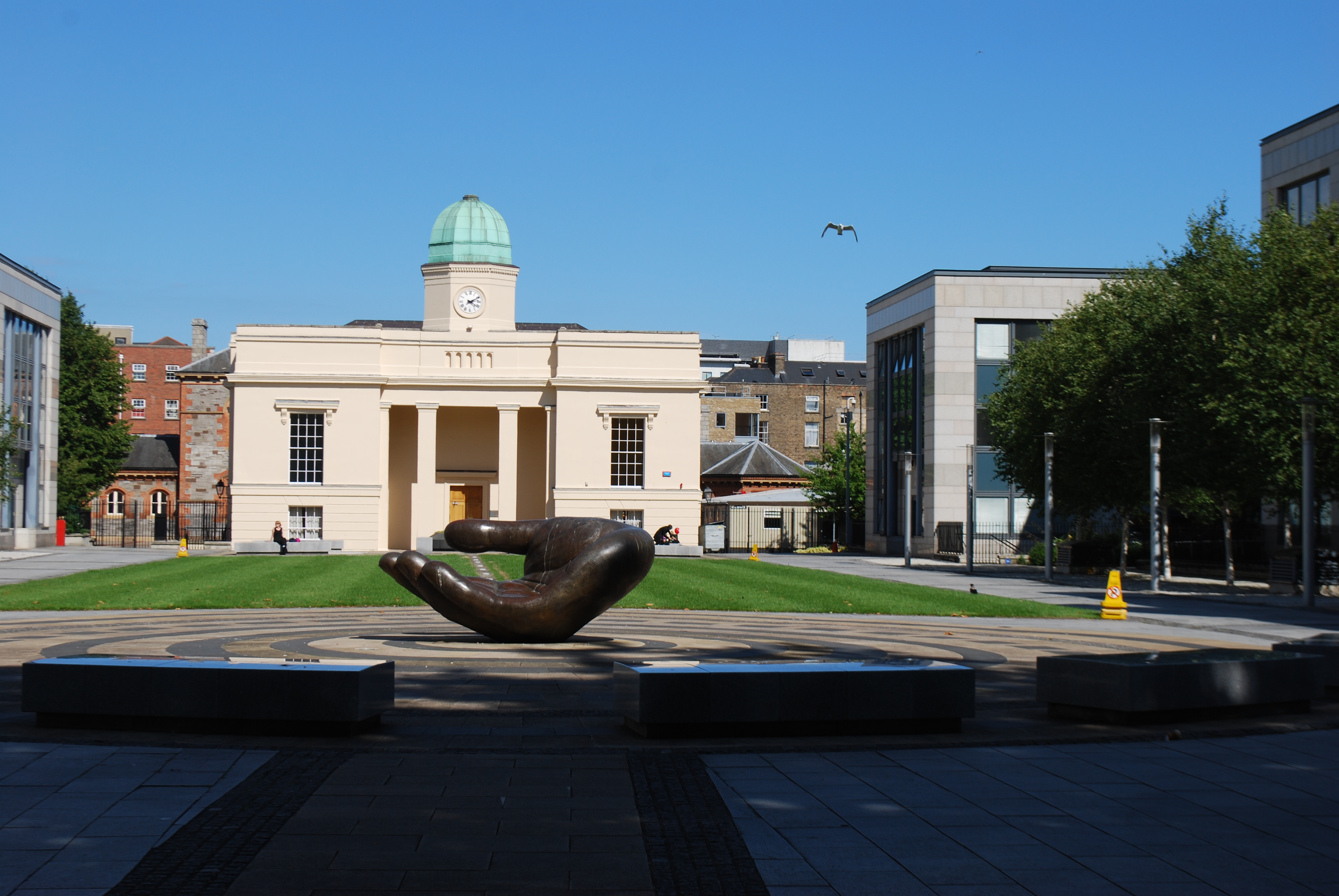

Department overview
- Formed: 26 August 1921
- Jurisdiction: Government of Ireland
- Headquarters: Tyrone House, Marlborough Street, Dublin; 53°20′57″N 6°15′27″W
- Annual budget: €11.9 billion (2025)
- Minister responsible: Hildegarde Naughton, Minister for Education and Youth
- Department executive: Bernie McNally, Secretary General
- Website: Official website

The Department of Education and Youth (Irish: An Roinn Oideachais agus Óige) is a department of the Government of Ireland. It is led by the Minister for Education and Youth.

== Departmental team ==
The official headquarters and ministerial offices of the department are at Marlborough Street, Dublin. The departmental team consists of the following:

- Minister for Education and Youth: Hildegarde Naughton, TD
  - Minister of State at the Department of Education and Youth with special responsibility for special education and inclusion: Michael Moynihan, TD
- Secretary General: Bernie McNally

== Overview ==
The department has the following divisions:

- Internal Audit
- Special Education, NEPS and Redress
- People Division
- Finance, Corporate Services, Communications and Parents and Learners
- Schools, Social Inclusion and Youth
- Corporate Services
- Planning and Building Unit
- Curriculum and Assessment
- Major Operations
- Chief Information Officer
- Chief Inspector of Education

== Aegis bodies ==
The following bodies are under the aegis of the department:

- An Chomhairle um Oideachais Gaeltachta agus Gaelscolaíochta
- Educational Research Centre
- National Council for Curriculum and Assessment
- State Examinations Commission
- Teaching Council
- National Council for Special Education
- CARANUA - Residential Institutions Statutory Fund
- Commission to Inquire into Child Abuse
- Residential Institutions Redress Board
- Residential Institutions Review Committee

== History ==
In the revolutionary period, the position was established by Dáil Éireann in 1920 as the Minister for Irish. This was expanded as the Secretary for Education in the Government of the 2nd Dáil.

It was provided a statutory basis by the Ministers and Secretaries Act 1924, passed soon after the establishment of the Irish Free State in 1922. This act provided it with:

the administration and business generally of public services in connection with Education, including primary, secondary and university education, vocational and technical training, endowed schools, reformatories, and industrial schools, and all powers, duties and functions connected with the same, and shall include in particular the business, powers, duties and functions of the branches and officers of the public services specified in the Fourth Part of the Schedule to this Act, and of which Department the head shall be, and shall be styled, an t-Aire Oideachais or (in English) the Minister for Education.

It also assigned it with the following branches of administration:

- The Commissioners of National Education in Ireland
- The Intermediate Education Board for Ireland
- The Commissioners of Education in Ireland (Endowed Schools)
- The Inspector of Reformatory and Industrial Schools
- The Department of Agriculture and Technical Instruction for Ireland (business and functions relating to Technical Instruction only).
- The College of Science
- The Geological Survey in Ireland
- The National Museum of Science and Art
- The National Library of Ireland
- The National Gallery of Ireland
- The Metropolitan School of Art
- Meteorological Services

In the early years of the state, the main focus was on running the national school primary system. Free secondary education was provided from 1968. The department also had the task of overseeing reformatory and industrial schools from 1922. The Commission to Inquire into Child Abuse, which reported in 2009 (the "Ryan Report"), found that this was rarely achieved.

The department's headquarters were situated within the grounds of Tyrone House, Dublin in what was formerly the home of the National Education Commissioners.

=== Alteration of name and transfer of functions ===
The name and functions of the department have changed by means of statutory instruments.

Date	Effect
2 June 1924	Establishment of the Department of Education
9 October 1936	Transfer of Meteorological Services to the Department of Industry and Commerce
13 July 1943	Allocation of the Genealogical Office
27 January 1984	Transfer of the National Gallery and National Museum to the Department of the Taoiseach
10 June 1986	Transfer of the National Library of Ireland to the Department of the Taoiseach
1 October 1997	Renamed as the Department of Education and Science
25 June 2002	Transfer of the Genealogical Office to the Department of Arts, Sport and Tourism
1 May 2010	Transfer of Skills Training from the Department of Enterprise, Trade and Employment
1 May 2010	Transfer of Research to the Department of Enterprise, Trade and Employment
2 May 2010	Renamed as the Department of Education and Skills
11 May 2011	Transfer of the National Education Welfare Board to the Department of Community, Equality and Gaeltacht Affairs
21 October 2020	Transfer of Further and Higher Education to the Department of Further and Higher Education, Research, Innovation and Science
22 October 2020	Renamed as the Department of Education
1 January 2021	Transfer of Education Welfare from the Department of Children, Equality, Disability, Integration and Youth
1 May 2025	Transfer of Youth from the Department of Children, Equality, Disability, Integration and Youth
2 May 2025	Renamed as the Department of Education and Youth
