= Department of Transport (Ireland) =

Irish government department

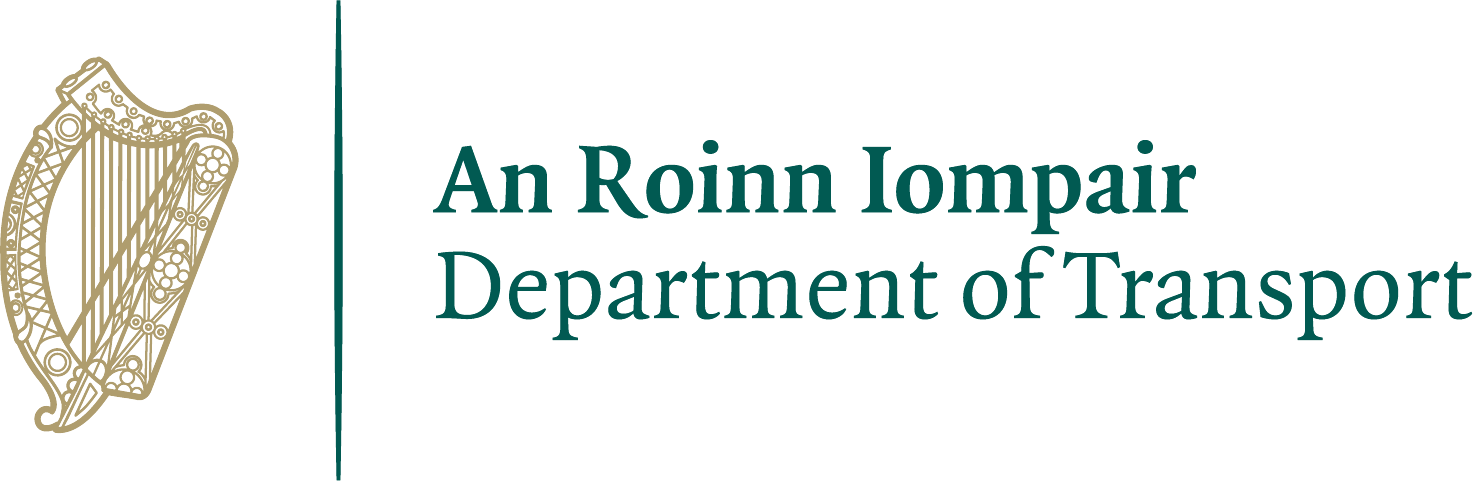

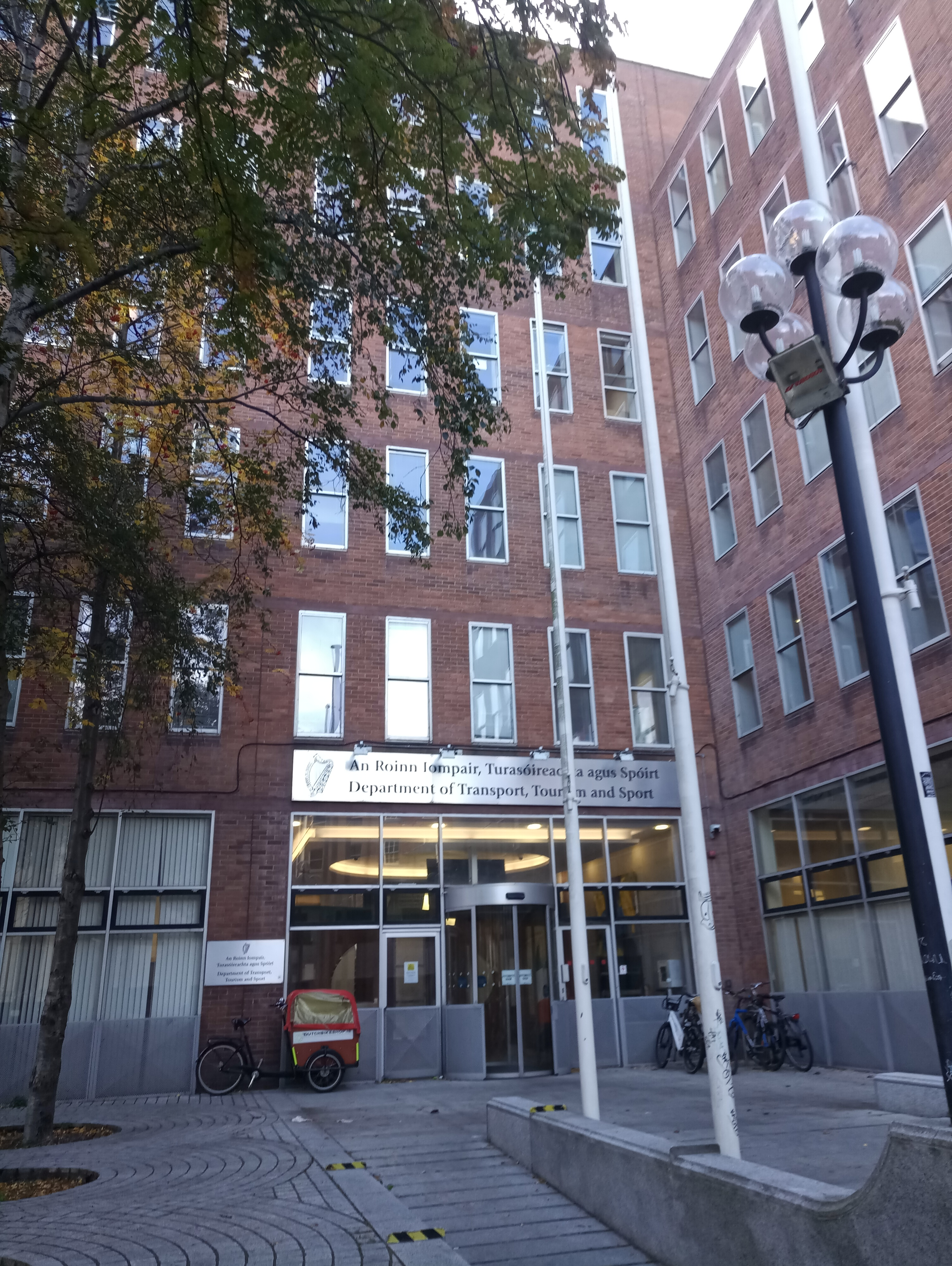
- Department headquarters

Department overview
- Formed: 1 November 1973
- Jurisdiction: Government of Ireland
- Headquarters: Leeson Lane, Dublin; 53°20′30″N 6°15′18″W
- Minister responsible: Darragh O'Brien, Minister for Transport
- Department executive: Ken Spratt, Secretary General
- Website: Official website

The Department of Transport (Irish: An Roinn Iompair) is a department of the Government of Ireland that is responsible for transport policy and overseeing transport services and infrastructure. The department is led by the Minister for Transport.

== Departmental team ==
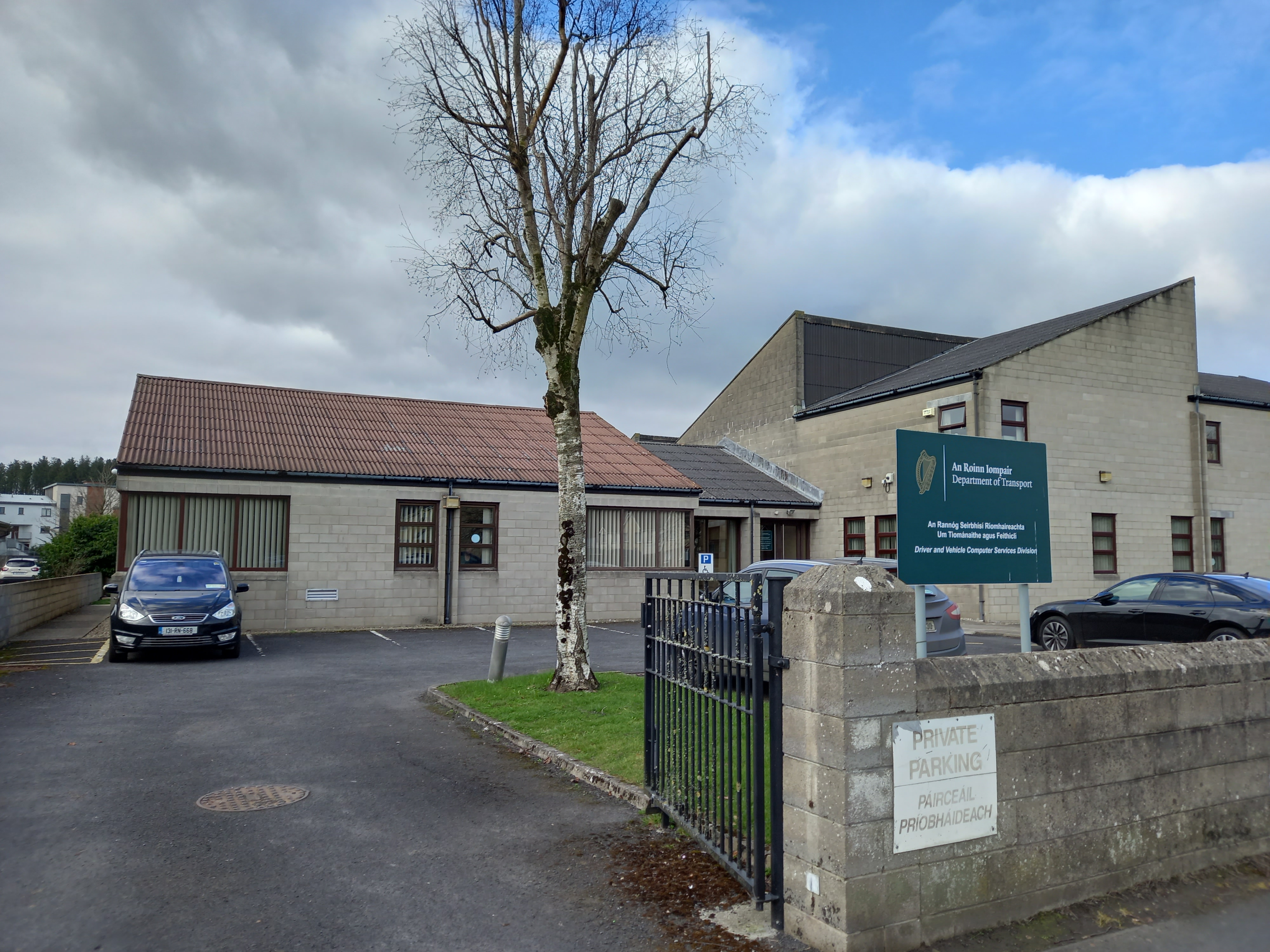
Department of Transport offices in Shannon, County Clare

The official headquarters and ministerial offices of the department are in Leeson Lane, Dublin. It also has offices in Killarney and Loughrea. The departmental team consists of the following:

- Minister for Transport: Darragh O'Brien, TD
  - Minister of State at the Department of Transport with special responsibility for international and road transport, logistics, rail and ports: Seán Canney, TD
  - Minister of State at the Department of Transport with special responsibility for rural transport: Jerry Buttimer, TD
- Secretary General of the Department: Ken Spratt

== Divisions ==
The department has the following divisions:

- Chief Information Officer, Digital Hub
- Aviation and Emergency Planning
  - including the Air Accident Investigation Unit
- Irish Coast Guard
- Public Transport
- Maritime Transport
- Climate Action and EU/International Division
- Roads Policy and Investment
- Corporate Affairs and Central Policy

== Aegis bodies ==
The following bodies are under the aegis of the department:

Commercial agencies

- CIÉ
  - Iarnród Éireann
  - Bus Éireann
  - Dublin Bus
- Dublin Port Company
- Port of Cork Company
- Port of Waterford
- Shannon Foynes Port Company
- DAA, the Dublin Airport Authority and the shadow Cork authorities
- Irish Aviation Authority
- AirNav Ireland
- The Shannon Airport Group

Non-commercial agencies

- Transport Infrastructure Ireland
- National Transport Authority
- Road Safety Authority
- Medical Bureau of Road Safety
- Commission for Railway Regulation
- Commissioners of Irish Lights

== History ==
Department of Transport and Power

Department overview
- Formed: 27 July 1959
- Preceding Department: Department of Industry and Commerce
- Dissolved: 2 January 1984
- Superseding Department: Department of Communications
- Jurisdiction: Ireland
- Minister responsible: Minister for Transport and Power
- Department executive: Secretary General

The Department of Transport and Power was created by the Ministers and Secretaries (Amendment) Act 1959 with Erskine H. Childers as its first minister. Thekla Beere was appointed as the Secretary of the Department in that year, making it the first government department to be led by a woman. On 2 January 1984, the Department of Transport was abolished under the Ministers and Secretaries (Amendment) Act 1983.

Date	Effect
27 July 1959	Establishment of the Department of Transport and Power
27 July 1959	Transfer of Transport, Fuel and Power from the Department of Industry and Commerce
13 September 1977	Transfer of Energy to the Department of Industry and Commerce
23 September 1977	Renamed as the Department of Tourism and Transport
25 January 1980	Transfer of Tourism to the Department of Industry, Commerce and Tourism
25 January 1980	Renamed as the Department of Transport
2 January 1984	Department abolished and functions transferred to the Department of Communications

The Department of the Public Service was created in 1973. Throughout most of the period of this ministerial title, it was held by a minister who also had another ministerial role. In 1987, at the formation of the 20th government, the substantive functions of the Department of the Public Service were transferred to the Department of Finance, and the Department of the Public Service was renamed as the Department of Tourism and Transport; therefore, the current Department of Transport is formally a successor to the Department of the Public Service established in 1973.

=== Alteration of name and transfer of functions ===
Date	Effect
1 November 1973	Establishment of the Department of the Public Service
1 November 1973	Transfer of Public Service from the Department of Finance
19 March 1987	Transfer of Public Service to the Department of Finance
20 March 1987	Renamed as the Department of Tourism and Transport
31 March 1987	Transfer of Transport from the Department of Communications
31 March 1987	Transfer of Tourism from the Department of the Marine
7 February 1991	Renamed as the Department of Tourism, Transport and Communications
6 February 1991	Transfer of Communications from the Department of Communications
20 January 1993	Transfer of Broadcasting to the Department of the Gaeltacht
20 January 1993	Transfer of Tourism to the Department of Energy
21 January 1993	Transfer of Energy from the Department of Energy
22 January 1993	Renamed as the Department of Transport, Energy and Communications
12 July 1997	Renamed as the Department of Public Enterprise
15 July 1997	Transfer of Mining to the Department of the Marine and Natural Resources
18 June 2002	Transfer of Roads from the Department of the Environment and Local Government
18 June 2002	Transfer of Communications and Energy to the Department of the Marine and Natural Resources
19 June 2002	Renamed as the Department of Transport
1 April 2011	Transfer of Tourism and Sport from the Department of Tourism, Culture and Sport
2 April 2011	Renamed as the Department of Transport, Tourism and Sport
1 June 2011	Transfer of Tourism and Sport from the Department of Tourism, Culture and Sport
1 January 2018	Transfer of Motor Tax from the Department of Housing, Planning and Local Government
16 September 2020	Transfer of Tourism and Sport to the Department of Culture, Heritage and the Gaeltacht
17 September 2020	Renamed as the Department of Transport
28 February 2023	Transfer of Renewable transport fuel from the Department of the Environment, Climate and Communications

== See also ==
- Driving licence in the Republic of Ireland
