= Department of Social Protection =

Irish government department

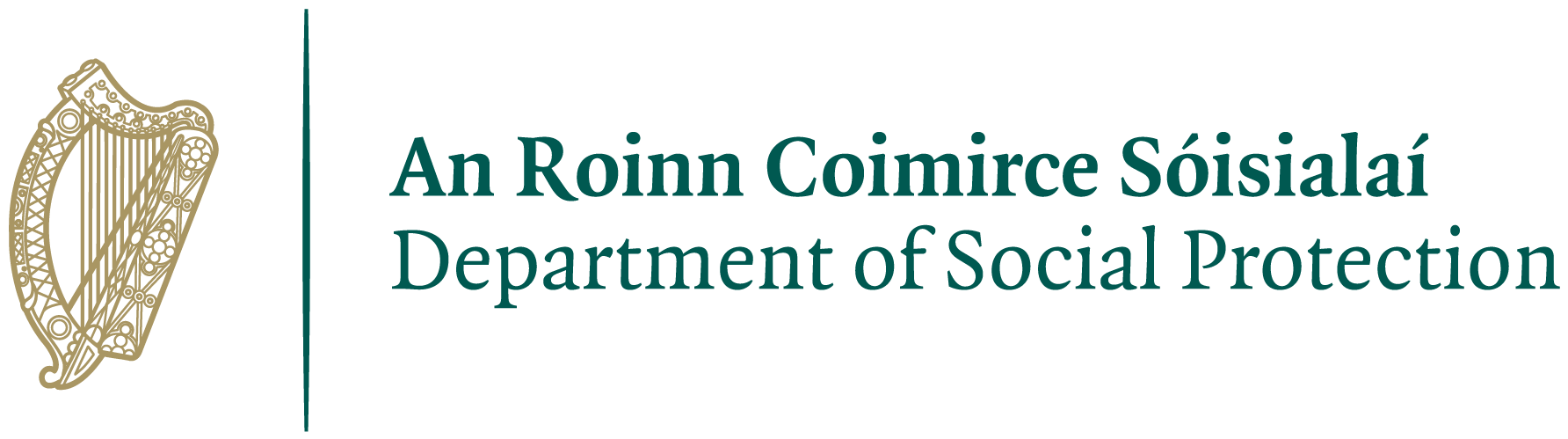

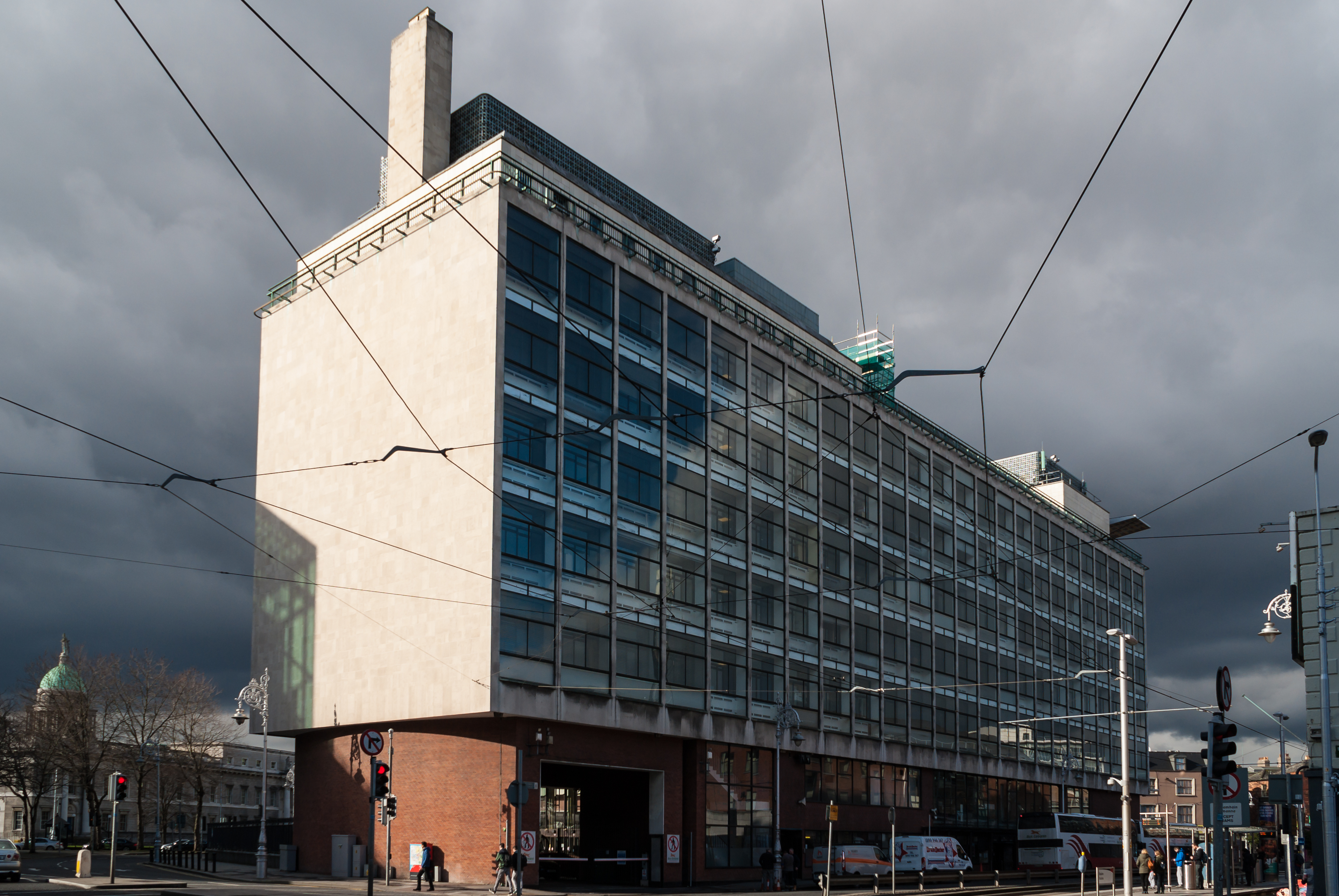
- Seat of the department above the Dublin bus terminal

Department overview
- Formed: 22 January 1947
- Jurisdiction: Government of Ireland
- Headquarters: Áras Mhic Dhiarmada, Store Street, Dublin; 53°20′59″N 6°15′8″W
- Employees: 6,539
- Annual budget: €25.1 billion (2021)
- Minister responsible: Dara Calleary, Minister for Social Protection
- Department executive: John McKeon, Secretary General
- Website: Official website

The Department of Social Protection (Irish: An Roinn Coimirce Sóisialaí) is a department of the Government of Ireland, tasked with administering Ireland's social welfare system. It oversees the provision of income support and other social services. It is led by the Minister for Social Protection.

== Departmental team ==
The official headquarters and ministerial offices of the department are in Áras Mhic Dhiarmada, Store Street, Dublin. The departmental team consists of the following:

- Minister for Social Protection: Dara Calleary, TD
- Secretary General of the Department: John McKeon

== Overview ==
In carrying out its mandate the department undertakes a variety of functions.

The department formulates appropriate social protection policies and administers and manages the delivery of statutory and non-statutory schemes and services. It is responsible for the delivery of a range of social insurance and social assistance schemes including provision for unemployment, illness, maternity, caring, widowhood, retirement and old age. Payments are made to nearly 950,000 people each week with over 1.5 million people directly benefiting from those payments. The budget allocation for 2021 is €25.1 billion. Prior the dissolution of FÁS in 2013, the department took over its employment support functions.

Payments are generally divided into three groups:

- Social Insurance (or contributory) payments which are made on the basis of PRSI Contributions.
- Social Assistance (or non-contributory) payments which are made on the basis of satisfying a means test.
- Universal payments (such as Child Benefit or Free Travel) which are not dependent on PRSI contributions or a means test.

The department provides its services through a network of 126 Intreo Centres and Branch Offices throughout the State and, increasingly, through its Mywelfare.ie portal.

Intreo Centres, launched in 2012, were a rebranding of the Social Welfare Offices around the State, updated to reflect the Department of Social Protection's new responsibilities when it brought in some 1,700 staff from FÁS and the HSE's Community Welfare Service.

== Controversies ==
In August 2019, the Data Protection Commissioner (DPC) found the Department of Social Protection's processing of personal data during the issuing of Public Services Cards (PSC) for use in transactions between a person and a public body other than the department itself to be illegal.

The commission also found that the blanket and indefinite retention of documents and information provided by people applying for a Public Services Card violate data protection law. The Data Protection Commission has given the department three weeks to stop all processing of personal data where a PSC is being issued solely for the purpose of a transaction between a member of the public and a public body, meaning that the data held on more than three million card holders must now be deleted.

== Agencies ==
- Citizens Information Board
- The Pensions Authority
- Office of the Pensions Ombudsman

== History ==
The department was created by the Ministers and Secretaries (Amendment) Act 1946 as the Department of Social Welfare. This took effect in 1947 with James Ryan as the first Minister.

=== Alteration of name and transfer of functions ===
| Date | Change |
|---|---|
| 22 January 1947 | Establishment of the Department of Social Welfare |
| 22 January 1947 | Transfer of Social Welfare |
| 15 October 1947 | Transfer of Social Welfare from the Department of Local Government |
| 3 October 1966 | Transfer of Labour to the Department of Labour |
| 12 July 1997 | Renamed as the Department of Social, Community and Family Affairs |
| 27 July 2001 | Transfer of Charities from the Department of Justice, Equality and Law Reform |
| 19 June 2002 | Renamed as the Department of Social and Family Affairs |
| 25 June 2002 | Transfer of Community Affairs to the Department of Community, Rural and Gaeltacht Affairs |
| 1 May 2010 | Transfer of Family Affairs and Social Inclusion to the Department of Community, Rural and Gaeltacht Affairs |
| 2 May 2010 | Renamed as the Department of Social Protection |
| 1 January 2011 | Transfer of Redundancy and Insolvency Payments from the Department of Enterprise, Trade and Innovation |
| 1 September 2017 | Transfer of Labour Affairs and Labour Law from the Department of Jobs, Enterprise and Innovation |
| 2 September 2017 | Renamed as the Department of Employment Affairs and Social Protection |
| 1 January 2018 | Transfer of Community Services Programme to the Department of Rural and Community Development |
| 14 October 2020 | Transfer of Employment Affairs and Employment Law to the Department of Business, Enterprise and Innovation |
| 21 October 2020 | Renamed as the Department of Social Protection |
