= Minister for Labour (Ireland) =

Former Irish government cabinet minister

Department of Equality and Law Reform
- Roinn Comhionannais agus Athchóirithe Dlí

Department overview
- Formed: 12 July 1966
- Preceding agencies: Department of Industry and Commerce and Department of Social Welfare (in 1966); Department of Justice in 1993)
- Dissolved: 8 July 1997
- Superseding agencies: Department of Enterprise and Employment (in 1993); Department of Justice, Equality and Law Reform (in 1997)
- Jurisdiction: Ireland
- Minister responsible: Minister for Equality and Law Reform

The minister for labour (Irish: Aire Oibreachais) was originally a position in the Government of the Irish Republic, the self-declared state which was established in 1919 by Dáil Éireann, the parliamentary assembly made up of the majority of Irish MPs elected in the 1918 general election. Constance Markievicz was the first person to hold the post. The office did not continue into the Executive Council of the Irish Free State.

The later office of Minister for Labour was created by the Ministers and Secretaries (Amendment) Act 1966 as a member of the Government of Ireland.

In 1993, the minister's functions were transferred to the minister for enterprise and employment and was succeeded by the minister for equality and law reform, a position which existed during the Fianna Fáil–Labour coalition led by Albert Reynolds (1993–1994) and the Fine Gael–Labour–Democratic Left coalition (1994–1997) led by John Bruton. Its primary functions were in the area of civil and family law reform (including divorce legislation) and equality legislation. Under both governments, the minister for equality and law reform was Labour Party TD Mervyn Taylor, although Máire Geoghegan-Quinn served as minister between November and December 1994, after Labour had left the coalition with Fianna Fáil.

In 1997, the minister's functions were transferred to the minister for justice, equality and law reform. The Department of Equality and Law Reform ceased to exist but was not formally abolished. The functions formerly exercised by the minister for labour are now exercised by the minister for enterprise, tourism and employment. The functions formerly exercised by the minister for equality and law reform are now exercised by the minister for children, disability and equality and the minister for justice, home affairs and migration.

== History ==
=== Alteration of name and transfer of functions ===
Date	Change
13 July 1966	Establishment of the Department of Labour
13 July 1966	Transfer of Labour from the Department of Industry and Commerce
3 October 1966	Transfer of Labour from the Department of Social Welfare
20 January 1993	Transfer of Labour to the Department of Industry and Commerce
21 January 1993	Renamed as the Department of Equality and Law Reform
3 February 1993	Transfer of Civil law reform, civil legal aid and the family mediation service from the Department of Justice
8 July 1997	Transfer of Equality and Law Reform to the Department of Justice

=== Legislation introduced by the Department of Equality and Law Reform ===
The following legislation was introduced by the Department:

- Matrimonial Home Bill 1993 (struck down by the Supreme Court)
- Interpretation (Amendment) Act 1993 - providing for gender inclusive language in Acts of the Oireachtas
- Jurisdiction of Courts and Enforcement of Judgments Act 1993 - providing for international enforcement of civil judgments
- Maintenance Act 1994 - EC enforcement of maintenance orders
- Maternity Protection Act 1994 - implemented EC law on maternity leave
- Stillbirths Registration Act 1994 - provided for registration of stillborn children for the first time in Irish law
- Adoptive Leave Act 1995 - extended maternity leave-type rights to adoptive parents
- Civil Legal Aid Act 1995 - put civil legal aid scheme on statutory basis
- Family Law Act 1995 - reformed law relating to judicial separation
- Occupiers Liability Act 1995 - provided for reduced liability to trespassers and recreational users
- Fifteenth Amendment of the Constitution of Ireland 1995 - provided for divorce in the Constitution
- Civil Liability (Amendment) Act 1996 - provided for increased damages for fatal injuries cases
- Domestic Violence Act 1996 - extended remedies in domestic violence cases
- Family Law (Divorce) Act 1996 - introduced divorce on a statutory basis
- Powers of Attorney Act 1996 - provided for enduring powers of attorney
- Registration of Births Act 1996 - provided for gender neutral birth certificates
- Family Law (Miscellaneous Provisions) Act 1997 - miscellaneous amendments.

The following legislation had originally been drafted by the Department but later enacted under the Department of Justice, Equality and Law Reform:

- Children Act 1997 - extending family law entitlements of natural fathers and grandparents and other amendments
- Employment Equality Act 1998
- Equal Status Act 2000.

== List of office-holders ==
Denotes acting Minister

=== Minister for Labour 1919–1922 ===
Name	Term of office		Party	Government(s) (Note: DM – Dáil Ministry; PG – Provisional Government;)
Constance Markievicz	2 April 1919	9 January 1922	Sinn Féin	2nd DM • 3rd DM
Joseph McGrath	11 January 1922	9 September 1922	Sinn Féin (Pro-Treaty)	4th DM • 1st PG
Patrick Hogan (acting)	17 July 1922	9 September 1922	Sinn Féin (Pro-Treaty)	1st PG
=== Minister for Labour 1966–1993 ===
Name	Term of office		Party	Government(s)
Patrick Hillery	13 July 1966	2 July 1969	Fianna Fáil	12th
Joseph Brennan	2 July 1969	14 March 1973	Fianna Fáil	13th
Michael O'Leary	14 March 1973	5 July 1977	Labour	14th
Gene Fitzgerald (Note: Also Minister for the Public Service)	5 July 1977	16 December 1980	Fianna Fáil	15th • 16th
Tom Nolan	16 December 1980	30 June 1981	Fianna Fáil	16th
Liam Kavanagh	30 June 1981	9 March 1982	Labour	17th
Gene Fitzgerald	9 March 1982	14 December 1982	Fianna Fáil	18th
Liam Kavanagh	14 December 1982	13 December 1983	Labour	19th
Ruairi Quinn	13 December 1983	20 January 1987	Labour	19th
Gemma Hussey	20 January 1987	10 March 1987	Fine Gael	19th
Bertie Ahern	10 March 1987	14 November 1991	Fianna Fáil	20th • 21st
Michael O'Kennedy	14 November 1991	11 February 1992	Fianna Fáil	21st
Brian Cowen	11 February 1992	12 January 1993	Fianna Fáil	22nd
Mervyn Taylor	12 January 1993	21 January 1993	Labour	23rd
=== Minister for Equality and Law Reform 1993–1997 ===
Name	Term of office		Party	Government(s)
Mervyn Taylor	21 January 1993	17 November 1994	Labour	23rd
Máire Geoghegan-Quinn (Note: Also Minister for Justice)	18 November 1994	15 December 1994	Fianna Fáil	23rd
Mervyn Taylor	15 December 1994	26 June 1997	Labour	24th
John O'Donoghue	26 June 1997	8 July 1997	Fianna Fáil	25th

=== Minister of State at the Department of Labour 1978–1993 ===
Under the Ministers and Secretaries (Amendment) (No. 2) Act 1977, the government may appoint a member of the Oireachtas to act as a minister of state in a department. The minister of state did not hold cabinet rank.

Name	Term of office		Party	Responsibilities	Government
Seán Calleary	12 December 1979	30 June 1981	Fianna Fáil		16th
Brendan Daly	25 March 1980	30 June 1981	Fianna Fáil		16th
George Birmingham	16 December 1982	13 February 1986	Fine Gael	Youth Affairs	19th
Enda Kenny	18 February 1986	10 March 1987	Fine Gael	Youth Affairs	19th
