= Ministers and Secretaries Acts =

Legislation governing structure of government of Ireland

Ministers and Secretaries Act 1924

Oireachtas
- Long title: AN ACT FOR CONSTITUTING AND DEFINING THE MINISTERS AND DEPARTMENTS OF STATE IN SAORSTAT EIREANN PURSUANT TO THE CONSTITUTION AND DECLARING THE FUNCTIONS AND POWERS OF THE ATTORNEY-GENERAL AND ENABLING THE APPOINTMENT OF PARLIAMENTARY SECRETARIES AND FOR PURPOSES INCIDENTAL THERETO
- Citation: No. 16 of 1924
- Territorial extent: Irish Free State/Ireland
- Enacted by: Dáil Éireann
- Enacted by: Seanad Éireann
- Commenced: 21 April 1924
- Status: Amended

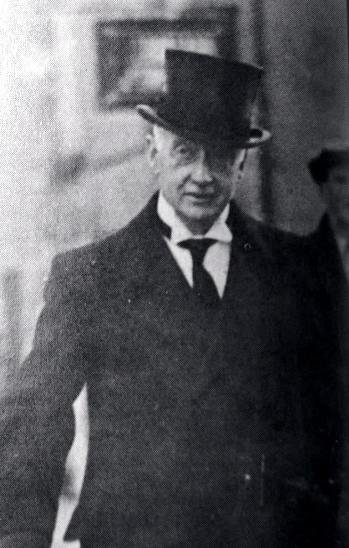
W. T. Cosgrave, whose government drafted the principal act

The Ministers and Secretaries Acts 1924 to 2020 is the legislation which governs the appointment of ministers to the Government of Ireland and the allocation of functions between departments of state. It is subject in particular to the provisions of Article 28 of the Constitution of Ireland. The Acts allow for the appointment of between 7 and 15 Ministers of Government across 17 Departments, and for the appointment of up to 20 junior ministers, titled Ministers of State, to assist the Ministers of Government in their powers and duties.

The principal act is the Ministers and Secretaries Act 1924 and was one of the key statutes enacted by the Irish Free State. The Constitution of the Irish Free State in 1922 had provided for the formation of a cabinet called the Executive Council. The 1924 Act formally defined the government departments that were to exist in the Free State, created their titles and outlined their responsibilities. The Act has been amended and affected by subsequent legislation which may be cited together and construed as one Act. The names and functions of departments have changed frequently by secondary legislation. Although the secretaries created by the 1924 Act were later replaced by ministers of state, as amendments to the principal Act, subsequent legislation changing the structures of government departments have continued to use the title Ministers and Secretaries Act.

== Background ==
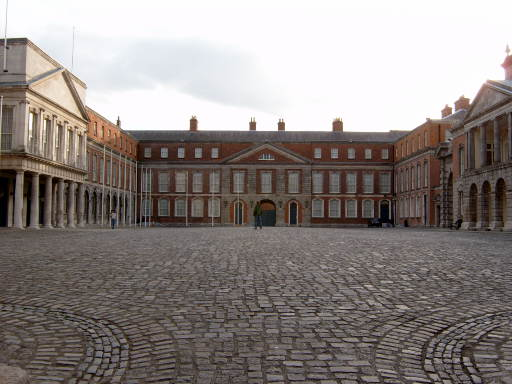
Dublin Castle, location of the Lord Lieutenant's administration until January 1922; the last remnants of which were swept away with the new Act.

=== Lord Lieutenant's administration ===
From 1801 to 1922, Ireland had been governed as part of the United Kingdom. The legal government of Ireland was an executive and Privy Council of Ireland under the British Lord Lieutenant of Ireland; in practice, the Dublin Castle administration was run by the Chief Secretary for Ireland.

=== Irish Republic and the Anglo-Irish Treaty ===
After the 1918 general election, MPs elected for Sinn Féin established the extrajudicial Dáil Éireann (House of Assembly) in January 1919 and made a unilateral declaration of independence of the Irish Republic. This operated without external recognition under the terms of the Dáil Constitution. Its executive, the Ministry of Dáil Éireann, was headed by the President of Dáil Éireann. In January 1922, a majority of the Dáil accepted the terms of the Anglo-Irish Treaty which agreed the terms of the independence of the Irish Free State from the United Kingdom.

In January 1922, a Provisional Government of Ireland was formed, approved by the members elected for the House of Commons of Southern Ireland in accordance with the provisions of the Treaty. By Order in Council under the Irish Free State (Agreement) Act 1922, the British Government formally transferred powers to the Provisional Government on 1 April 1922.

=== Constitution of the Irish Free State ===
On 6 December 1922, under the Treaty's provisions, the new Constitution of the Irish Free State, having been enacted separately by the 3rd Dáil, sitting as a constituent assembly, and the Parliament of the United Kingdom, came into force through a proclamation issued by the King. Both the Dáil Ministry and the Provisional Government were replaced by the Executive Council, under the chairmanship of the President of the Executive Council. Initially its governmental offices were an amalgam of posts from the Lord Lieutenant's administration, the Provisional Government and the Dáil Ministry. For example, there was an Irish Postmaster General, a post that had existed in the Lord Lieutenant's administration, and a Minister for Home Affairs, an office created as part of the Dáil ministry.

=== New legislation ===
In the Governor-General's Address to Dáil Éireann at the State Opening of the Oireachtas on 3 October 1923 the first indication was given that:

Amongst the measures to be submitted to you will be one providing for the organisation of the great departments of State, the distribution of their functions in a manner calculated to bring about greater efficiency in administration, and the regular Constitution of the Ministries charged with the administration of the various Departments of Government.

The Ministers and Secretaries Bill 1923 was introduced by William T. Cosgrave, President of the Executive Council, on 16 November 1923. The governmental structures that were to be a permanent feature of independent Irish government were regularised and defined. Positions which had existed under the Dublin Castle administration, like those of Postmaster-General and Solicitor-General, were merged into new Departments of State, as was the Ministry for Labour, which had been part of the Dáil Ministry. Some positions which had been created by the Dáil Ministry were given new names, such as the Minister for Home Affairs, which became the Minister for Justice. The bill was enacted as the Ministers and Secretaries Act 1924, and was commenced on 2 June 1924.

== Departments of State ==
The 1924 Act created the following government departments:

Name	Minister	Current title
Department of the President of the Executive Council	President of the Executive Council	Department of the Taoiseach
Department of Finance	Minister for Finance	Department of Finance
Department of Justice	Minister for Justice (Note: The minister had been known as the Minister for Home Affairs in the Dáil Ministry and between 1922 and 1924.)	Department of Justice, Home Affairs and Migration
Department of Local Government and Public Health	Minister for Local Government and Public Health	Department of Housing, Local Government and Heritage
Department of Education	Minister for Education	Department of Education and Youth
Department of Lands and Agriculture	Minister for Lands and Agriculture (Note: This new department replaced the Department of Agriculture and Technical Drawing that had existed under the Lord Lieutenant originally under Sir Horace Plunkett at the start of the century.)	Department of Agriculture, Food and the Marine
Department of Industry and Commerce	Minister for Industry and Commerce (Note: The Minister for Labour in the Dáil Ministry was assigned this Department.)	Department of Enterprise, Tourism and Employment
Department of Fisheries	Minister for Fisheries	Department of Climate, Energy and the Environment
Department of Posts and Telegraphs	Minister for Posts and Telegraphs (Note: This department and minister assumed the role of the Postmaster General of the United Kingdom in the jurisdiction of the Irish Free State. The office of Postmaster General of Ireland had been abolished in 1831.)	Abolished in 1984
Department of Defence	Minister for Defence	Department of Defence
Department of External Affairs	Minister for External Affairs	Department of Foreign Affairs and Trade

Notes

Ten of the eleven departments created in 1924 continue to exist, with changes in most cases to departmental title and functions. Section 6 of the Ministers and Secretaries (Amendment) Act 1939 permits the Government to alter the title of any department of state or minister and to transfer branches between departments.

=== Departments created post-1924 ===
The following departments were created by later amending legislation:

Creation	Name	Minister	Current title
8 September 1939	Department of Supplies	Minister for Supplies	Abolished on 1 August 1945
22 January 1947	Department of Health	Minister for Health	Department of Health
22 January 1947	Department of Social Welfare	Minister for Social Welfare	Department of Social Protection
2 July 1956	Department of the Gaeltacht	Minister for the Gaeltacht	Department of Children, Disability and Equality
27 July 1959	Department of Transport and Power	Minister for Transport and Power	Abolished on 2 January 1984
13 July 1966	Department of Labour	Minister for Labour	Lapsed in 1997
1 November 1973	Department of the Public Service	Minister for the Public Service	Department of Transport
13 December 1977	Department of Economic Planning and Development	Minister for Economic Planning and Development	Department of Culture, Communications and Sport
2 January 1984	Department of Communications	Minister for Communications	Lapsed in 1991
6 July 2011	Department of Public Expenditure and Reform	Minister for Public Expenditure and Reform	Department of Public Expenditure, Infrastructure, Public Service Reform and Digitalisation
19 July 2017	Department of Rural and Community Development	Minister for Rural and Community Development	Department of Rural and Community Development and the Gaeltacht
2 August 2020	Department of Further and Higher Education, Research, Innovation and Science	Minister for Further and Higher Education, Research, Innovation and Science	Department of Further and Higher Education, Research, Innovation and Science

== Ministers of State ==
Section 7 of the 1924 Act permitted the Executive Council to appoint up to seven members of the Oireachtas as parliamentary secretaries to the Executive Council or to Executive Ministers.

The Ministers and Secretaries (Amendment) (No. 2) Act 1977 abolished the position of parliamentary secretary. In its place, it permitted the government to appoint up to ten members of the Oireachtas (Dáil or Seanad) to the position of Minister of State (Irish: Aire Stáit), a ministerial position of non-cabinet rank attached to one or more of the Departments of State. These changes took effect on 1 January 1978. In June 2020 Pippa Hackett became the first senator appointed as a Minister of State. Unlike government ministers who are appointed by the President on the advice of the Taoiseach with the prior approval of the Dáil, Ministers of State are appointed by the cabinet, on nomination of the Taoiseach.

Ministers of State continue in office after the dissolution of the Dáil until a successor is appointed. If the Taoiseach resigns from office, a Minister of State is also deemed to have resigned from office. A Minister of State ceases to hold office if they are appointed as a Government Minister. A Minister of State may resign from office by letter addressed to the Taoiseach.

Powers and duties of a Government Minister may be delegated to a Minister of State by a statutory instrument. If the Government Minister resigns, these powers must delegated again on the appointment of a new Government Minister.

In 1980, the number of Ministers of State permitted was increased from 10 to 15; in 1995 it was raised to 17; and in 2007 it was raised to 20.

== Other provisions of the Acts ==
Section 3(2) of the 1924 Act (later repealed and replaced in similar terms by s. 4 of the Ministers and Secretaries (Amendment) Act 1946) allowed for two or more Departments of State to be assigned to the same member of Government. At present, Simon Harris is Minister for Foreign Affairs and Trade and Minister for Defence, Darragh O'Brien is Minister for Climate, Energy and the Environment and Minister for Transport, and Dara Calleary is Minister for Social Protection and Minister for Rural and Community Development and the Gaeltacht.

Section 6 of the 1924 Act created the post of Attorney-General of the Irish Free State. This post was to take over, "the business, powers, authorities, duties and functions formerly vested in or exercised by the Attorney-General for Ireland, the Solicitor-General for Ireland, the Attorney-General for Southern Ireland, the Solicitor-General for Southern Ireland, the Law Adviser to the Lord Lieutenant of Ireland and any or all of them respectively…".

The 1924 Act also created an official Seal for the Executive Council, and created a Council for Defence to aid and advise the Minister for Defence. It provided for the existence of ministerial salaries for members of the Executive Council and Parliamentary Secretaries and that all executive orders were to be published in the Irish state gazette, to be known as Iris Oifigiúil.

The 1939 Act allowed a member of the Government to be a minister without portfolio, not being assigned to a Department of state, but to be given a specific style or title. This was the case for Frank Aiken, who was Minister for the Co-ordination of Defensive Measures from 1939 to 1945. It is also the case for members of the government who are named to head a government department which is being created under an amendment to the Ministers and Secretaries Acts.

The 1939 Act also permitted the Taoiseach to perform a cabinet reshuffle.

== See also ==
- Irish cabinets since 1919
