= Department of Enterprise, Tourism and Employment =

Irish government department

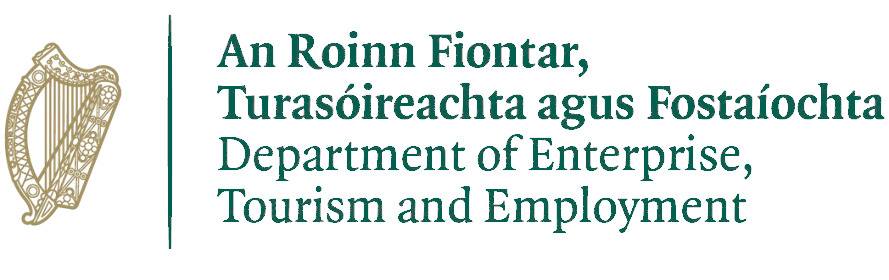

Department overview
- Formed: 17 June 1919
- Jurisdiction: Government of Ireland
- Headquarters: Kildare Street, Dublin; 53°20′24″N 6°15′21″W
- Minister responsible: Peter Burke, Minister for Enterprise, Tourism and Employment
- Department executive: Declan Hughes, Secretary General
- Website: Official website

The Department of Enterprise, Tourism and Employment (Irish: An Roinn Fiontar, Turasóireachta agus Fostaíochta) is a department of the Government of Ireland. It is led by the Minister for Enterprise, Tourism and Employment.

== Departmental team ==
- Minister for Enterprise, Tourism and Employment: Peter Burke, TD
  - Minister of State for trade promotion, artificial intelligence and digital transformation: Niamh Smyth, TD
  - Minister of State for small businesses and retail: Alan Dillon, TD
- Secretary General of the Department: Declan Hughes

== Overview ==
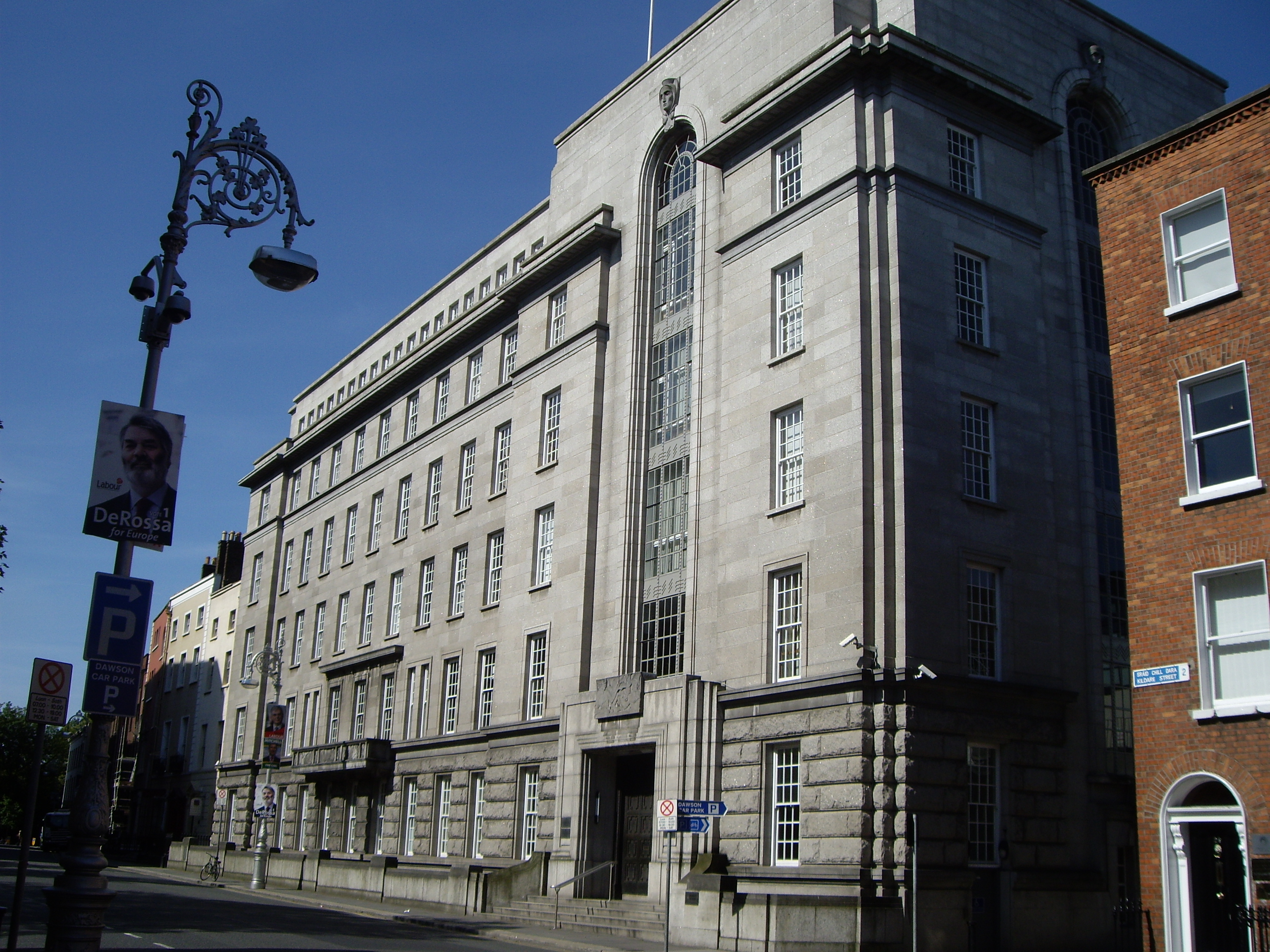
Department Headquarters, Kildare Street, Dublin

The official headquarters and ministerial offices of the department are at Kildare Street, Dublin. It is one of the most important economic departments in the Irish Government, responsible for the implementation of policy in five key areas:

- Enterprise, Innovation, Growth
- Quality Work and Learning
- Making Markets and Regulation work better
- Quality, Value and Continuous Improvement
- the European Union.

A large element of the work of the department arises from Ireland's membership of a number of international organisations, in particular the European Union and the World Trade Organization. The department plays an active role in the development of EU and WTO policies, particularly to ensure that Ireland's interests are protected. The department is organised into five divisions. They are:

- Innovation and Investment Division
- Enterprise and Trade Division
- Commerce, Consumer and Competition Division
- Employment Rights and Industrial Relations Division
- Corporate Services

== Bodies and offices associated with the Department ==
The department oversees a large number of bodies and agencies. In July 2009 the Special Group on Public Service Numbers and Expenditure Programmes proposed merging the Competition Authority and the National Consumer Agency. However, this process remains at an early stage. Until 2010, the department was responsible for FÁS, which had its responsibilities divided up between two bodies in 2013. Bodies and agencies associated with the Department include:

- Companies Registration Office
- Competition and Consumer Protection Commission
- Local Enterprise Offices
- Director of Corporate Enforcement
- Employment Appeals Tribunal
- Enterprise Ireland
- Health and Safety Authority
- IDA Ireland
- InterTradeIreland (under North-South co-operation structures)
- Irish Auditing and Accounting Supervisory Authority
- Labour Court
- Workplace Relations Commission
- National Standards Authority of Ireland
- Office of the Register of Friendly Societies
- Patents Office
- Personal Injuries Assessment Board

== History ==
In the Ministry of Dáil Éireann of the Irish Republic (1919–1922) there was a separate Minister for Industries and a Director of Trade and Commerce. These titled varied over the course of the ministries established during this revolutionary period. In the Irish Free State, there was a Minister for Industry and Commerce as part of the first Executive Council of the Irish Free State established in 1922. This was given a statutory basis by the Ministers and Secretaries Act 1924. This act provided it with:

the administration and business generally of public services in connection with trade, commerce, industry, and labour, industrial and commercial organisations and combinations, industrial and commercial statistics, transport, shipping, natural resources, and all powers, duties and functions connected with the same, including the promotion of trade and commerce by means of educational grants, and shall include in particular the business, powers, duties and functions of the branches and officers of the public services specified in the Sixth Part of the Schedule to this Act, and of which Department the head shall be, and shall be styled, an t-Aire Tionnscail agus Tráchtála or (in English) the Minister for Industry and Commerce.

The Schedule assigned it with the duties of the following bodies:

- Ministry of Transport (excluding the Roads Department).
- The Board of Trade.
- Registrar of Companies.
- Registrar of Business Names.
- Registration of Shipping.
- Minister for Labour.
- Electricity Commissioners.
- Chief and other Inspectors of Factories.

=== Alteration of name and transfer of functions ===
Date	Effect
2 June 1924	Established as the Department of Industry and Commerce
1 August 1945	Transfer of Supplies from the Department of Supplies
27 July 1959	Transfer of Transport, Fuel and Power to the Department of Transport and Power
12 July 1966	Transfer of Labour to the Department of Labour
13 September 1977	Transfer of Energy from the Department of Transport and Power
23 September 1977	Renamed as the Department of Industry, Commerce and Energy
22 January 1980	Transfer of Energy to the Department of Energy
23 January 1980	Renamed as the Department of Industry, Commerce and Tourism
24 January 1980	Transfer of Tourism from the Department of Tourism and Transport
20 August 1981	Transfer of Industry to the Department of Energy
21 August 1981	Renamed as the Department of Trade, Commerce and Tourism
16 December 1983	Transfer of Industry from the Department of Industry and Energy
17 December 1983	Renamed as the Department of Industry, Trade, Commerce and Tourism
18 February 1986	Transfer of Tourism to the Department of Fisheries and Forestry
19 February 1986	Renamed as the Department of Industry and Commerce
20 January 1993	Transfer of Labour from the Department of Labour
20 January 1993	Transfer of Trade to the Department of Energy
20 January 1993	Renamed as the Department of Enterprise and Employment
11 July 1997	Transfer of Trade from the Department of Tourism and Trade
12 July 1997	Renamed as the Department of Enterprise, Trade and Employment
1 May 2010	Transfer of Skills to the Department of Education and Science
1 May 2010	Transfer of Research from the Department of Education and Science
2 May 2010	Renamed as the Department of Enterprise, Trade and Innovation
1 January 2011	Transfer of Redundancy and Insolvency Payments to the Department of Social Protection
1 June 2011	Transfer of Trade to the Department of Foreign Affairs
2 June 2011	Renamed as the Department of Jobs, Enterprise and Innovation
1 January 2013	Transfer of Equality Tribunal from the Department of Justice and Equality
1 September 2017	Transfer of Employment Affairs and Employment Law to the Department of Social Protection
2 September 2017	Renamed as the Department of Business, Enterprise and Innovation
23 September 2020	Transfer of Trade from the Department of Foreign Affairs and Trade
14 October 2020	Transfer of Employment Affairs and Employment Law from the Department of Employment Affairs and Social Protection
10 November 2020	Renamed as the Department of Enterprise, Trade and Employment
1 January 2021	Transfer of Research Policy and Programmes to the Department of Further and Higher Education, Research, Innovation and Science
1 June 2025	Transfer of Tourism from the Department of Tourism, Culture, Arts, Gaeltacht, Sport and Media
2 June 2025	Renamed as the Department of Enterprise, Tourism and Employment
