= Department of Finance (Ireland) =

Irish government department

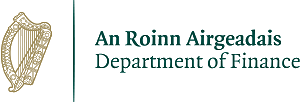

Department overview
- Formed: 22 January 1919
- Jurisdiction: Government of Ireland
- Headquarters: Government Buildings, Merrion Street, Dublin; 53°20′21″N 6°15′13″W
- Annual budget: €439 million (2017)
- Minister responsible: Simon Harris, Minister for Finance
- Department executive: John Hogan, Secretary General
- Child agencies: Comptroller and Auditor General; Central Bank; NAMA; NTMA; Revenue Commissioners
- Website: Official website

The Department of Finance (Irish: An Roinn Airgeadais) is a department of the Government of Ireland. It is led by the Minister for Finance.

The Department of Finance is responsible for the administration of the public finances of Ireland and all powers, duties and functions connected with the same, including in particular, the collection and expenditure of the revenues of Ireland from whatever source arising.

== Departmental team ==
- Minister for Finance: Simon Harris, TD
  - Minister of State for financial services, credit unions and insurance: Robert Troy, TD
- Secretary General of the Department: John Hogan

== Overview ==
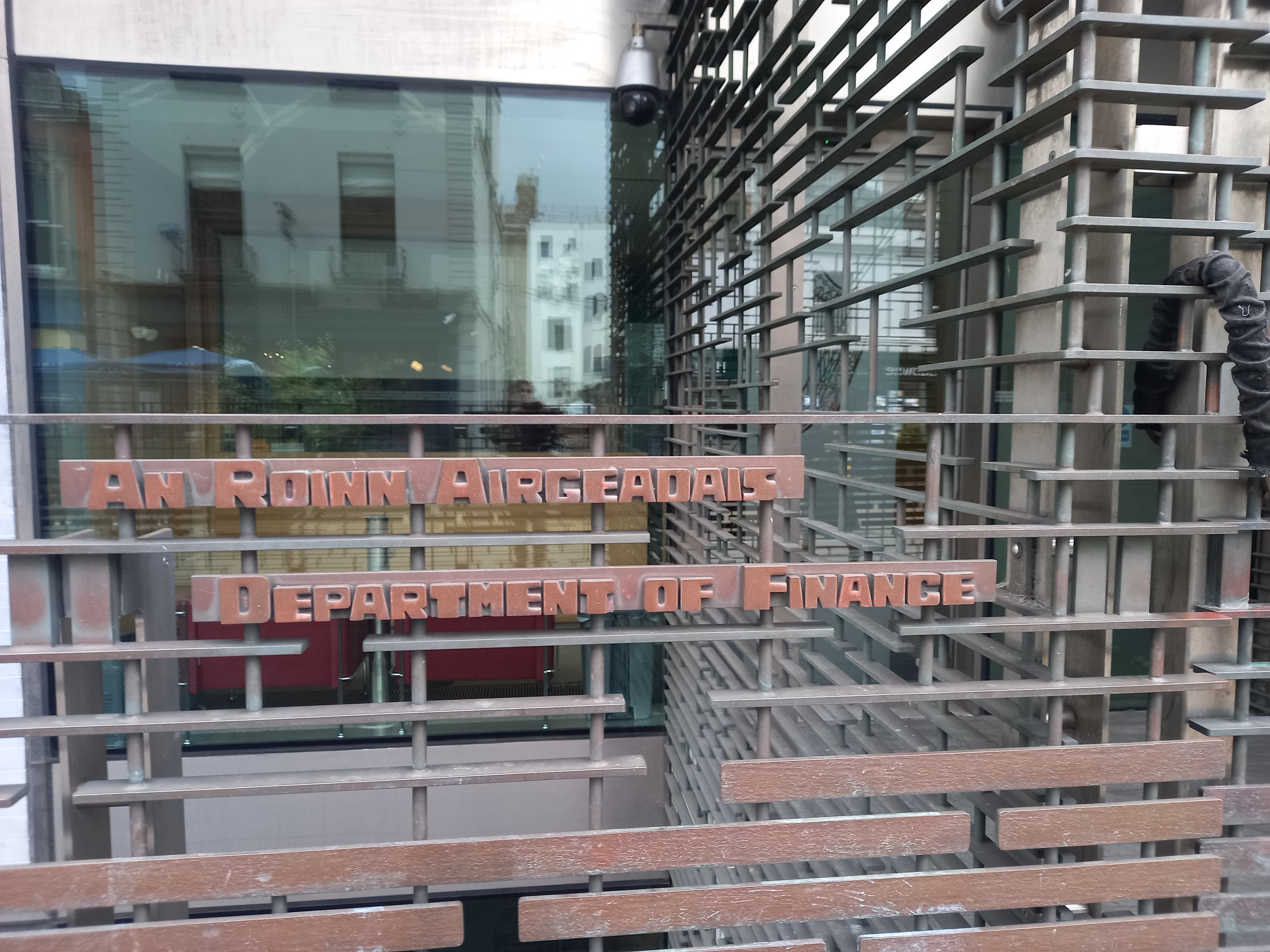
Metalwork at Department of Finance buildings

The official headquarters and ministerial offices of the department are in Government Buildings, Merrion Street, Dublin. The Department of Finance has a central role in implementing Irish Government policy, in particular the Programme for Government, and in advising and supporting the Minister for Finance and the Government on the economic and financial management of the State and the overall management and development of the public sector.

There are nine divisions within the Department of Finance:

- Shareholding and Financial Advisory Division
- Tax Division
- Economic Division
- Financial Services Division with responsibility for Legal Unit
- EU and International Division
- Human Resources Division
- International Finance and Climate Division
- Banking Division
- Corporate Affairs with responsibility for the Finance unit and FMU

== History ==
There was a Ministry of Finance in the Ministry of Dáil Éireann of the Irish Republic established on 22 January 1919. It was provided a statutory basis by the Ministers and Secretaries Act 1924, passed soon after the establishment of the Irish Free State in 1922. This act provided it with:

the administration and business generally of the public finance of Saorstát Eireann and all powers, duties and functions connected with the same, including in particular the collection and expenditure of the revenues of Saorstát Eireann from whatever source arising (save as may be otherwise provided by law), and the supervision and control of all purchases made for or on behalf of and all supplies of commodities and goods held by any Department of state and the disposal thereof, and also the business, powers, duties and functions of the branches and officers of the public service specified in the first part of the Schedule to this Act, and of which Department the head shall be, and shall be styled an t-Aire Airgid or (in English) the Minister for Finance.

The Schedule assigned it the following bodies:

- The business and functions formerly administered, and discharged by the British Treasury in Ireland.
- The Revenue Commissioners.
- The Paymaster General and Deputy Paymaster for Ireland.
- The Government Actuary.
- The Commissioners of Public Works in Ireland.
- The Civil Service Commission.
- The Commissioner of Valuation and Boundary Surveyor for Ireland.
- The Ordnance Survey.
- The Superintendent of the Teachers' Pension Office.
- The Stationery Office.
- The Old Age Pensions, save as regards appeals governed by Statute.
- The Post Office Savings Bank (administered through the Minister for Posts and Telegraphs as agent).
- The Registrar of Friendly Societies.

The Department of Finance has retained its title since its establishment. It is the only department mentioned in the Constitution of Ireland. In 1973, its public service functions were transferred to the new Department of the Public Service. Until 1980, the position of the Minister for the Public Service was required by law to be assigned to the Minister for Finance. In 1987, these functions were transferred back to the Department of Finance.

In 1980, the functions of the Department of Economic Planning (established in 1977) were transferred to the Department of Finance. These functions are principally to promote and co-ordinate economic and social planning, including sectoral and regional planning, to identify development policies, to review the methods adopted by departments of state to implement such policies and generally to advise the government on economic and social planning matters.

In July 2011, the Department of Public Expenditure and Reform was established, and a considerable number of the functions of the Department of Finance were transferred to that department.

== Secretaries of the Department ==
=== Secretary of the Department ===
Name	Term of office	
William O'Brien	February 1922	21 February 1923
Joseph Brennan	22 February 1923	20 September 1927
James J. McElligott	21 September 1927	31 March 1953
Owen J. Redmond	1 April 1953	29 May 1956
T. K. Whitaker	30 May 1956	28 February 1969
Charles H. Murray	1 March 1969	29 February 1976
M.N. Ó Murchú	1 March 1976	17 October 1977
Tomás F. Ó Cofaigh	18 October 1977	31 October 1981
Maurice F. Doyle	1 November 1981	30 April 1987
Seán P. Cromien	1 May 1987	12 June 1994
Paddy Mullarkey	13 June 1994	1 September 1997
=== Secretary General of the Department ===
Name	Term of office	
Paddy Mullarkey	2 September 1997	9 March 2000
John Hurley	10 March 2000	10 March 2002
Tom Considine	11 March 2002	30 June 2006
David Doyle	1 July 2006	29 January 2010
Kevin Cardiff	1 February 2010	2 February 2012
John Moran	6 March 2012	7 May 2014
Derek Moran	3 July 2014	May 2021
John Hogan	May 2021	Incumbent

== See also ==
- Irish Fiscal Advisory Council
- Green Jersey Agenda
