= Civil Service of the Republic of Ireland =

Government and state staff

The Civil Service (Irish: An Státseirbhís) of the Republic of Ireland is the collective term for the permanent staff of the departments of state and certain state agencies who advise and work for the Government of Ireland. It consists of two broad components, the Civil Service of the Government and the Civil Service of the State. Whilst the differences between these two components are largely theoretical, some fundamental operational distinctions exist.

== Development ==
The Civil Service of the Irish Free State was not formally established by any specific legislation. The Anglo-Irish Treaty of 1921 did however provide that the Government of the Irish Free State became responsible for those who were discharged or retired from the civil or public services in the new state, except a few exempted personnel recruited in response of the Anglo-Irish War. The exact status and compensation of such people was further codified in law by the Civil Service (Transferred Officers) Compensation Act 1929. This had the effect that the state became responsible for essentially all former Dublin Castle administration civil servants based in the new state.

The first attempt at formally regulating the Civil Service was the Civil Service Regulation Act, 1923 which was essentially a transitional arrangement and in 1924 was replaced by the Civil Service Regulation Act 1924. The result of these acts was the Civil Service Commissioners (later the Office of the Civil Service and Local Appointments Commissioners), a commission of three persons charged with determining the standards for entry to the Civil Service of the Government of Saorstát Éireann. Entry to the Civil Service was generally by competitive examination, and a number of qualifications such as ability, age, character, health and knowledge could be predefined. Applicants also had to meet nationality requirements. An order in 1924 required female civil servants to retire on marriage. The competitive examination system was created to ensure that the appointment of people to the institutions of the state would be based on merit only, and as such limiting any spoils system type influence. This became criticised as being a rigid system in which promotion was based primarily on one's seniority and not on the ability of forward-thinking or risk-taking. A result of this was that the Civil Service became regarded as retaining its British outlook until well into the 1950s, T. K. Whitaker was among a new generation of civil servants who would "break the mould" and cast off this image.

The Civil Service of the Government is the direct descendant of the Civil Service of the Government of Saorstát Éireann, as provided for in Article 56 of the Constitution of Ireland, one of the transitory provisions intended to ensure continuance of institutions of the state.

A significant reform of the Civil Service occurred by the Civil Service Regulation Act 1956 and Civil Service Commissioners Act 1956. However, these two acts placed in primary law the requirement that many women would face mandatory retirement on marriage. This provision was rescinded by the Civil Service (Employment of Married Women) Act 1973.

In 2004 the Office of the Civil Service and Local Appointments Commissioners was abolished and replaced by two separate bodies, the Commission for Public Service Appointments, a standards-setting body, and the Public Appointments Service (PAS), a central recruitment agency for the Civil Service. Government departments may recruit directly, though most avail of the services of the PAS.

The Public Service Superannuation (Age of Retirement) Act 2018 allows civil servants to work until the age of 70 if they choose.

== Civil Service ==
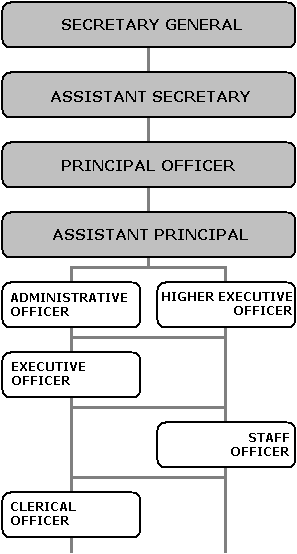
Organisational structure of the Civil Service showing junior and senior grades.

All civil servants are expected to be impartial and to act within the law. A member of the Civil Service is expected to maintain political impartiality and all grades must not seek nomination or election to the European Parliament or Houses of the Oireachtas. Certain grades are also barred from seeking nomination or election to local authorities and civil servants above the clerical grade must not take part in public debate outside their normal official duties (for instance, privately contributing to newspapers, radio, or television would be considered a violation of this principle). All civil servants, including those on career break or retirement are subject to the Official Secrets Act 1963, as amended, exceptions to this include the Freedom of Information Act.

Civil servants must not take part in anything that may involve a conflict of interest, and if they seek outside work must bring it to the attention of their line manager who may refuse the request. Civil servant grades and positions defined as "designated positions" under the Ethics in Public Office Acts must make a disclosure of interests where they have a relevant interest.

The grading structure is heavily based on that of the British Civil Service. Traditionally the Administrative Officer grade was the highest grade at which one could join the Civil Service, with higher grades filled by internal promotion. Entry positions are recruited openly by the Public Appointments Service (formerly the Civil Service and Local Appointments Commission). The Social Partnership agreement Towards 2016 allowed for a proportion of the previously internally filled positions to be advertised and filled externally, at the grades of Principal Officer, Assistant Principal and Higher Executive Officer. Many positions at Assistant Secretary level (generally the second most senior grade in a Government Department) have also been advertised externally in recent years.

In some departments or offices, particularly at senior levels in the Civil Service of the State, different titles (such as Director or Commissioner) may be applied to positions instead of the traditional grade. There also exists the grades of Services Officer, Administrative Officer, and Second Secretary which only exist in certain departments or offices. Specialist or technical positions may have a different grading structure. It has become practice in recent times for some outside advisors to also work in government departments, such as programme managers, however the conditions and remuneration of such individuals varies with government.

=== Civil Service of the Government ===
The Civil Service of the Government (Irish: Státseirbhís an Rialtais) is the body of civil servants which advises and carries out the work of the Government, through the Departments of state, each of which is directed by a Minister of the Government. The permanent head of a department is known as the Secretary General. The head of the Civil Service is the Secretary General to the Government, who is also Secretary General of the Department of the Taoiseach. Additionally, civil servants in the Garda Síochána are civil servants of the government (Garda Síochána Act 2005).

The largest reform of the Civil Service occurred in 1984 when the abolition of the Department of Posts and Telegraphs led to the halving of Civil Service numbers. The affected personnel, mainly postal and telecommunications workers, were transferred to An Post and Telecom Éireann respectively.

=== Civil Service of the State ===
The Civil Service of the State (Irish: Státseirbhís an Stáit) is a relatively small component of the overall Civil Service, and its members are expected to be absolutely independent of the government, in addition to normal political independence which is expected.

Civil servants in the offices of the Office of the Revenue Commissioners, Office of Public Works, Comptroller and Auditor-General of Ireland, Courts Service of Ireland, Director of Public Prosecutions, Fiosrú, Legal Aid Board, Houses of the Oireachtas, Information Commissioner and the Ombudsman are all considered to be part of the Civil Service of the State; certain other offices are also prescribed under the Civil Service of the State.
