= Cabinet of the Cook Islands =

Executive council of the government of the Cook Islands

The Cabinet of the Cook Islands is the policy and decision-making body of the executive branch of the Cook Islands Government. It consists of the Prime Minister and a number of other Ministers, who are collectively responsible to Parliament.

== Legislative basis ==
Unlike other Commonwealth Realms, the Cook Islands Cabinet has a formal legislative basis in the Cook Islands Constitution. Cabinet consists of the Prime Minister and up to six other ministers. The Constitution as originally enacted allowed for between three and five cabinet ministers. The Constitution was amended in 1970 to allow up to six cabinet ministers besides the prime minister, in 1991 to between six and eight ministers, and most recently in 1999 again restricted to no more than six. The 1999 amendment had also specified that while five ministers would be appointed from members of parliament, any sixth minister would have to be appointed from someone outside parliament. In 2026, the Constitution was again amended to require all six potential ministers to be appointed from within parliament.

Members are appointed by the King's Representative on advice of the Prime Minister.

All Cabinet ministers also serve as members of the Executive Council, which advises the King's Representative. Cabinet decisions take effect after four days, or when formally confirmed by the Executive Council.

== Current members ==
As of 8 February 2024, the Cook Islands Cabinet consisted of:

Cabinet ministers

Incumbent	Portfolios and responsibilities	Since
Mark Brown (Cook Islands Party)	Prime Minister; Attorney General; Minister responsible for the Office of the Prime Minister; Minister responsible for the Public Service Commission; Minister of Police; Minister of Finance; Minister of Economic Development; Minister responsible for the Seabed Minerals Authority; Minister of Tourism; Minister of Energy and Renewable Energy; Minister of Outer Islands Special Projects; Minister of Telecommunications	1 June 2020
Albert Nicholas (Cook Islands Party)	Deputy Prime Minister; Minister of Infrastructure Cook Islands; Minister responsible for the Business Trade and Investment Board; Minister responsible for National Environment Services; Minister responsible for the Cook Islands Investment Corporation; Minister of Transport	16 February 2024
Rose Toki-Brown (Independent)	Minister of Health; Minister of Agriculture; Minister responsible for Cook Islands National Superannuation; Minister of Internal Affairs	2 June 2021
Vaine Mokoroa (Cook Islands Party)	Minister of Youth and Sports; Ombudsman; Minister of Education; Minister responsible for the Financial Supervisory Commission; Minister responsible for the Financial Services Development Authority; Minister of Audit; Minister responsible for the Public Expenditure Review Committee; Minister of Justice	2 June 2021
George Angene (Cook Islands Party)	Minister of Corrective Services; Minister of Culture; Minister responsible for the House of Ariki; Minister responsible for the Punanga Nui; Minister responsible for the Head of State	10 July 2018
Tingika Elikana (Cook Islands Party)	Minister of Foreign Affairs; Minister of Immigration; Minister of Marine Resources; Minister of Parliamentary Services	31 January 2024
