= Inniskeen =

Village in County Monaghan, Ireland

Inishkeen Inis Caoin
- Village
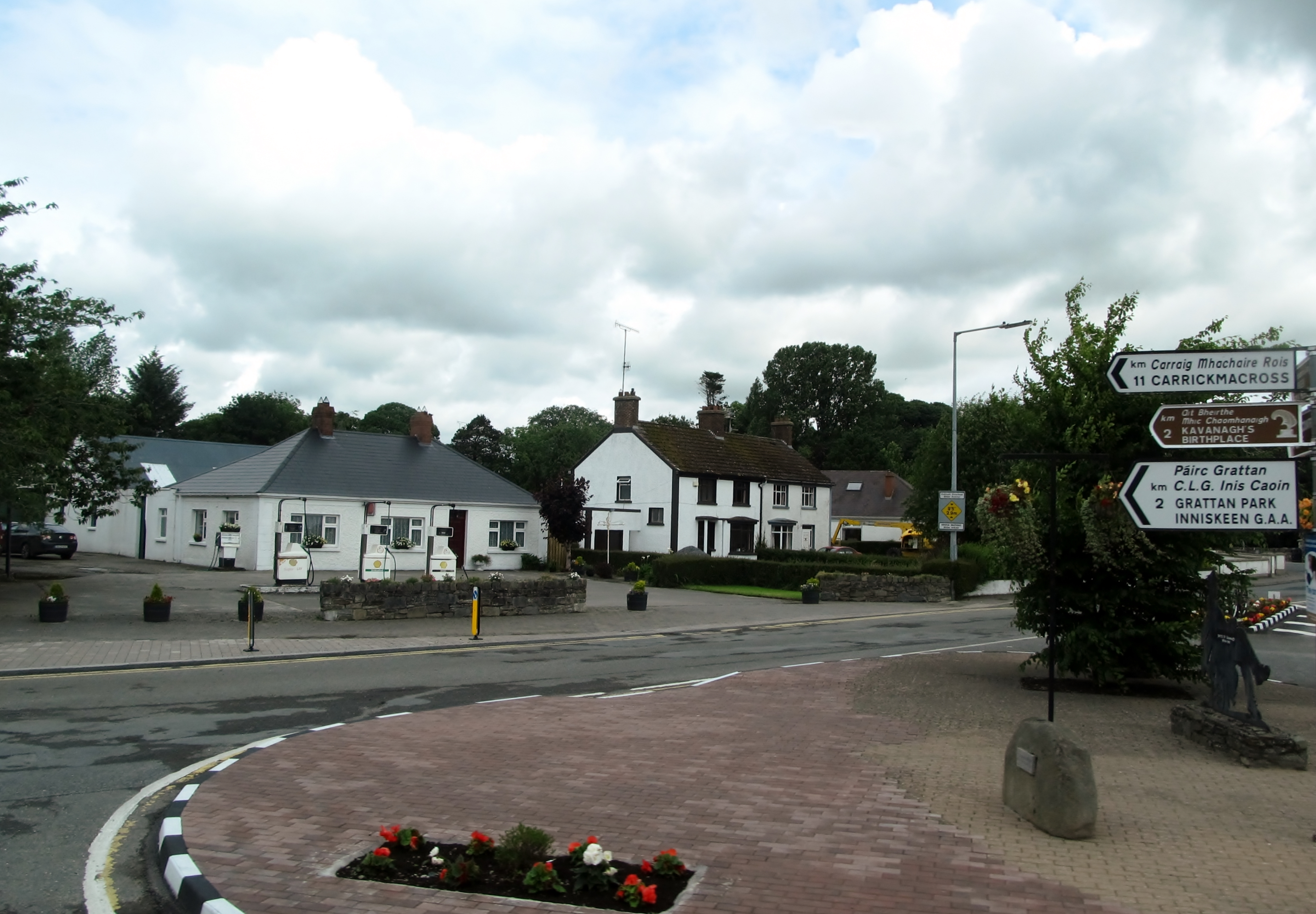
- Inniskeen village centre

- Location in Ireland
- Coordinates: 54°00′00″N 6°35′35″W
- Country: Ireland
- Province: Ulster
- County: County Monaghan
- Elevation: 57 m (187 ft)

Population (2016)
  - Total: 273
- Time zone: UTC+0 (WET)
  - Summer (DST): UTC+1 (IST (WEST))

Inniskeen, officially Inishkeen (Irish: Inis Caoin, meaning 'peaceful island'), is a small village, townland and parish in County Monaghan, Ireland, close to the County Louth and County Armagh borders. The village is located about 17 kilometres (11 mi) from Dundalk, 11 km (7 mi) from Carrickmacross, and 5 km (3 mi) from Crossmaglen. Seven townlands of this Roman Catholic Diocese of Clogher parish lie within County Louth.

== History ==
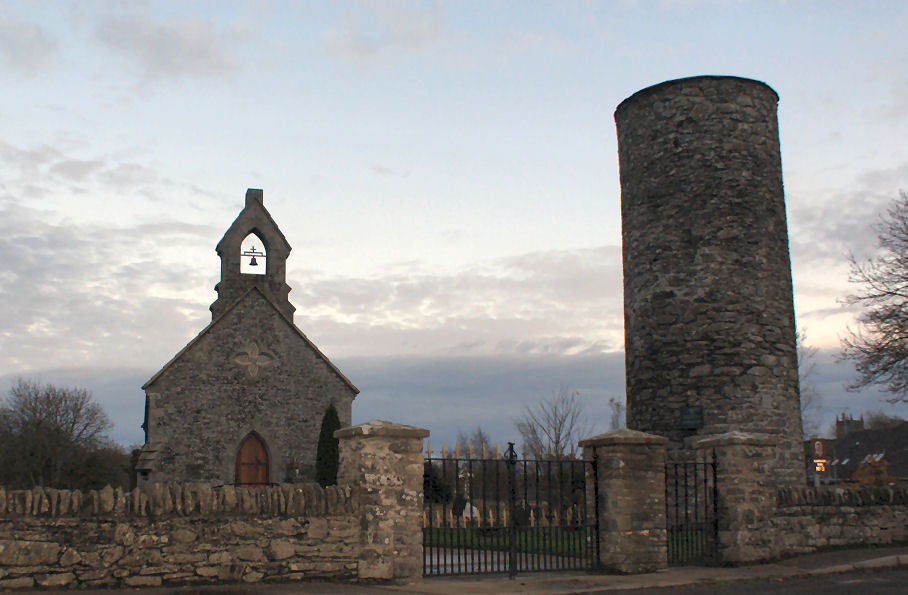
Round Tower, Inniskeen

This territory had been inhabited from the Late Neolithic/Early Bronze Age. Rock art carvings (Petroglyphs) have been discovered in adjoining townlands (including Drumirril) dating to 3000 BC. Cup and ring marks with concentric circles are the main inscriptions. They have been excavated by UCD School of Archaeology. Finds on the site ranged from late Neolithic to the early Christian period. These included ancient cooking places known as Fulachta Fiadh. Unlike Newgrange the carvings are on the bedrock and not part of a constructed monument. It is not open to public viewing, A Bronze Age cyst grave was also discovered in Inniskeen Glebe townland.

A monastery was founded here sometime between the 6th and 7th centuries by Saint Daigh MacCarell which was burned in 789, plundered by the Vikings in 948, and burned a second time in 1166. The bottom third of the round tower remains (42 feet high). In this drumlin country, many of the hilltops have hill forts and associated souterrains which date from the late Iron Age or early Christian era. The country was part of McMahon Clann territory and displaced Carrolls in the 9th century as the dominant force in the area.

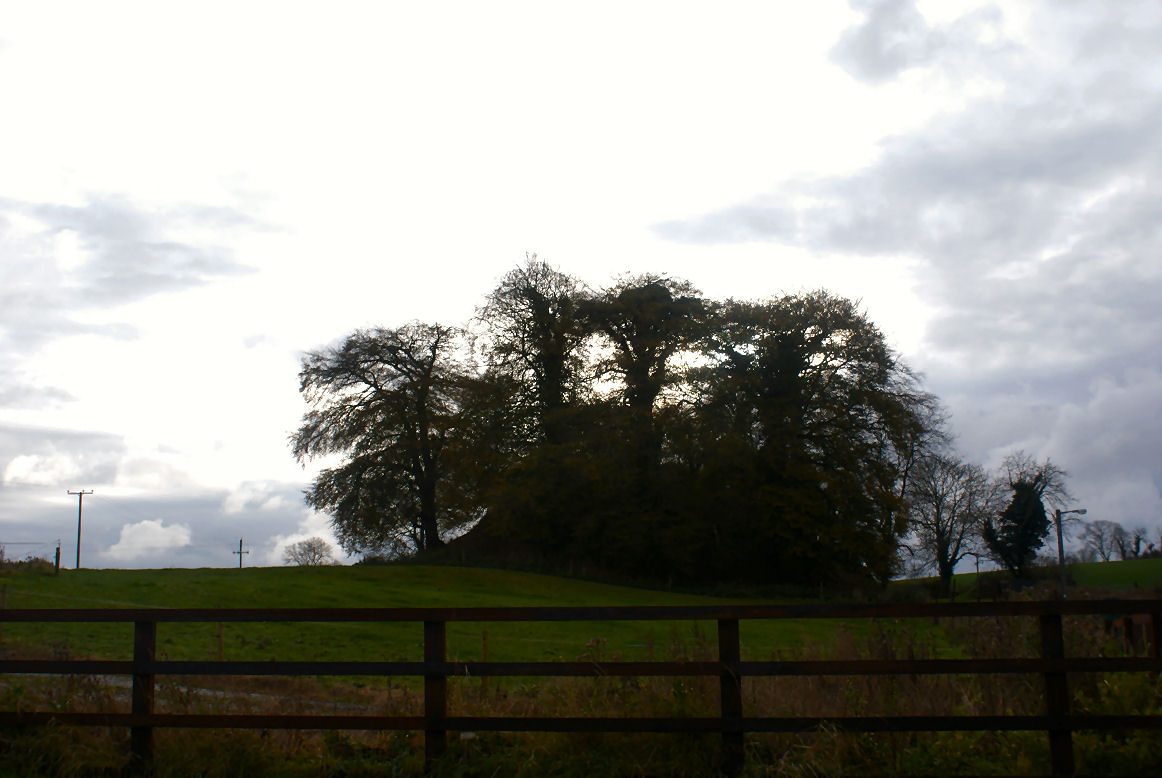
Norman Motte, Candlefort, Inniskeen

The arrival of the Normans saw the construction of a motte-and-bailey in the 13th century. The motte is still standing. The arrival of the Augustinian order of monks saw the construction of a new monastery of that order as a branch of the Abbey at Louth. One section of its wall remains adjoining the graveyard in the field adjoining the Motte.

Robert Devereux, 2nd Earl of Essex was granted the Barony of Farney, including Inniskeen, by Queen Elizabeth I of England in the late 16th century. These lands devolved to Viscount Weymouth. The Marquess of Bath sold this estate to the tenants in the 1880s under the land Acts.

In 1806, the first record of hurling and Gaelic football in Inniskeen, in a match in which Monaghan beat Louth, is celebrated in the Irish poem Iommain Iniis Chaoin.

The GNR(I) Inniskeen railway station opened on 1 April 1851, closed for passenger traffic on 14 October 1957 and finally closed altogether on 1 January 1960. It was on the Dundalk to Enniskillen line was a junction for the Carrickmacross line.

Patrick Kavanagh Centre The Patrick Kavanagh Centre is set up to commemorate the poet Patrick Kavanagh. Rosaleen (Smyth) Kearney, daughter of one of Patrick's classmates, Ann (Malone) Smyth, helped organize and ran the Centre in its early years; the Centre houses exhibitions outlining Kavanagh's life story and local history. The Patrick Kavanagh Centre is housed in Inniskeen's former Roman Catholic church, St Mary's. This building, which dates from 1820, was deconsecrated in 1974 when a new parish church was built. Kavanagh was baptized here, attended regular Mass and served as an altar boy here in his youth. St Mary's Church features in his novel, Tarry Flynn, and also in the semi-autobiographical, The Green Fool. Kavanagh is buried in the adjoining churchyard, along with his wife, brother and sisters.

Patrick Kavanagh, one of Ireland's best-known poets, was born in Inniskeen in 1904. The exhibition covers his life, writing and legacy.

== Transport ==
In July 2023, Local Link launched route 171 from Shercock to Dundalk, via Carrickmacross and Inniskeen, with several journeys each way daily. An electric bus is utilised on the route. Bus Éireann route 166 also serves the village, linking it to Dundalk and Carrickmacross.

== Sport ==
The local Gaelic Athletic Association (GAA) club is Inniskeen Grattans. Founded in 1883, and predating the founding of the GAA in 1884, the club won its first county championship in August 1888. They subsequently played Cavan champions Maghera Mac Finns in the first Ulster final which ended in a draw. Inniskeen Grattans won the replay in December 1888, winning the first-ever Ulster Senior Football Championship. In addition to winning several Monaghan Senior Football Championship and Monaghan Senior Hurling Championship titles, Inniskeen won the 2005–06 All-Ireland Intermediate Club Football Championship by defeating Caherlistrane GAC in the final. The club opened a new stadium in 2008.

Inniskeen Pitch & Putt club has an 18-hole course on the banks of the River Fane.

== People ==
- Oliver Callan (born 1980), satirist and comedian from RTÉ Radio 1 programme Callan's Kicks.
- Patrick Kavanagh (1904–1967), regarded as one of the foremost Irish poets of the 20th century, was born and grew up in Inniskeen. He is buried in Inniskeen graveyard.
- Peter Kavanagh (1916–2006), brother of Patrick, was a writer, scholar and publisher, who collected, edited, and published the works of Patrick Kavanagh. He is also buried in Inniskeen graveyard.
- Heber MacMahon (1600–1650), Lord Bishop of Clogher, commander of the Catholic Confederate forces at the Battle of Scarrifholis.
- William P. Quinn (1900–1978) was the first Commissioner of the Garda Síochána to rise through the ranks from ordinary Garda when he was appointed in February 1965.

== See also ==
- List of towns and villages in Ireland
- List of abbeys and priories in County Monaghan
