= 2024 New Zealand electoral calendar =

2024 elections in New Zealand

This is a list of elections that were held in New Zealand and associated states and territories in 2024. Included are any local or national elections or by-elections, as well as elections to iwi governing bodies, and any party leadership votes.

== Overview of key electoral events ==
=== Party leadership votes ===
Date	Party	Role	Person before	Person after	Support	Voters
10 March	Green	Co-leader	James Shaw (resigned)	Chlöe Swarbrick	169 / 171 (98.83%)	Green local branch delegates
27–28 July	Green	Co-leaders	Marama Davidson	Marama Davidson	>75%	Green local branch delegates
27–28 July	Green	Co-leaders	Chlöe Swarbrick	Chlöe Swarbrick	>75%	Green local branch delegates

=== Local elections ===
Date	Jurisdiction	Council control before	Mayor before	Council control after	Mayor after
20 July	Tauranga	Under commission	Under commission	No majority	Mahé Drysdale
15 August	Aitutaki	No majority	Tekura Bishop	No majority	Nick Henry

=== Iwi elections ===
Date	Iwi	Role	Person before	Person after	Support	Voters
3–5 September	Waikato-Tainui	Kīngitanga monarch	Tūheitia^{†}	Nga wai hono i te po	Unanimous	Tekau-mā-rua members

== January to March ==
- 17 February:
  - Wellington City council by-election in the Pukehīnau/Lambton general ward
  - Hamilton City Council by-election in the Hamilton East general ward
- 10 March: Green Party co-leadership election

== April to June ==
- 24 May: Hastings District Council by-elections in the Heretaunga general ward and Takitimu Māori ward.

== July to September ==
- 20 July: Tauranga City Council election
- 27–28 July: Confirmation vote of Green Party co-leaders held at their AGM per party constitution
- 7 August: Hamilton City Council by-election in the Kirikiriroa Māori ward
- 15 August: Cook Islands local elections
- 3–5 September: Kīngitanga election following death of Tūheitia

== October to December ==
- 23 October:
  - Mangaia Island Government by-election in the Ivirua constituency
  - Penrhyn Island Government by-election in the Tetautua constituency
- 17 December: Huntly Community Board by-election

== See also ==
- 2024 in New Zealand
