= Patrick Kavanagh Centre =

Museum in County Monaghan, Ireland

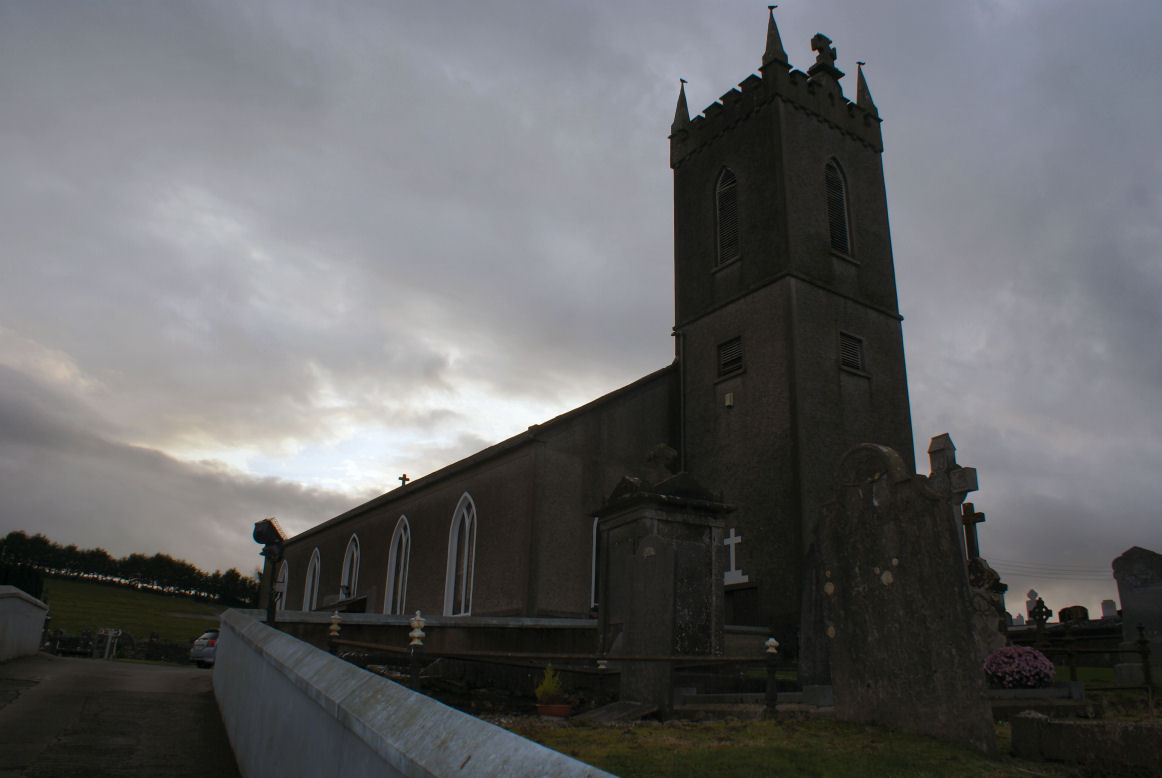
Patrick Kavanagh Centre, Inniskeen

The Patrick Kavanagh Centre (Patrick Kavanagh Rural And Literary Resource Centre) is located in Inniskeen, County Monaghan, Ireland. It is set up to commemorate the poet Patrick Kavanagh who is regarded as one of the foremost Irish poets of the 20th century. He was born in Mucker townland Inniskeen. It is located in the former RC St. Mary's church (which dates from 1820) in whose adjoining graveyard Kavanagh and his wife are buried. The centre was developed by the Inniskeen Enterprise Development Group and was opened by President Mary Robinson in 1994. The centre underwent a €1 million renovation before reopening in July 2020.

== History ==
Mary Robinson President of Ireland dedicated the Kavanagh Centre in Inniskeen in 1994, saying: ‘Let us remember him as he deserves to be remembered: not as an ornament to our literature - although he certainly is that - but as a poet who is still living among us, through his powerful and challenging poems and the force of his artistic conscience.’

In 2004 President Mary McAleese laid a wreath on Patrick Kavanagh's grave and gave a short address at the centre as part of the centenary of Patrick Kavanagh's birth, She had previously visited the centre in 1998.

== Exhibitions ==
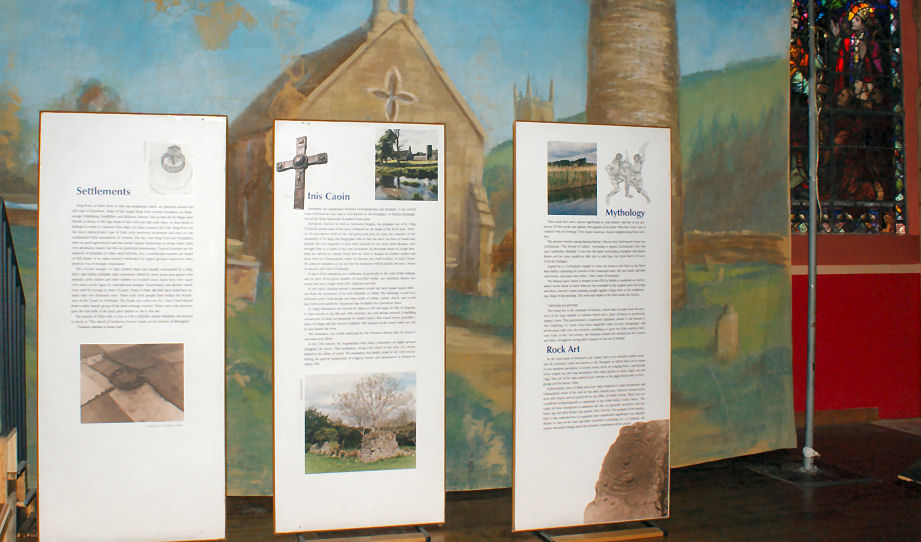
Interior Patrick Kavanagh Centre

The centre houses exhibitions outlining Kavanagh's life story as well as the history of the surrounding area. It includes a topographical model of the area, a model illustrating Kavanagh's poem, "A Christmas Childhood" paintings, and informational panels on the poet. The Peter Kavanagh hand press is on loan from the Kavanagh Archive of University College Dublin. Kavanagh's Death Mask which was formerly owned by John Ryan is also on display. There are many other memorabilia on display including letters, and the font Kavanagh was baptised in.

=== Audio-visual theatre ===
There is a 60-seater Audio-visual theatre, which is used to show films on Kavanagh, Including "Self Portrait" a half an hour straight to camera monologue by the Poet recorded for RTÉ in 1962.

=== Tours of Kavanagh Country ===
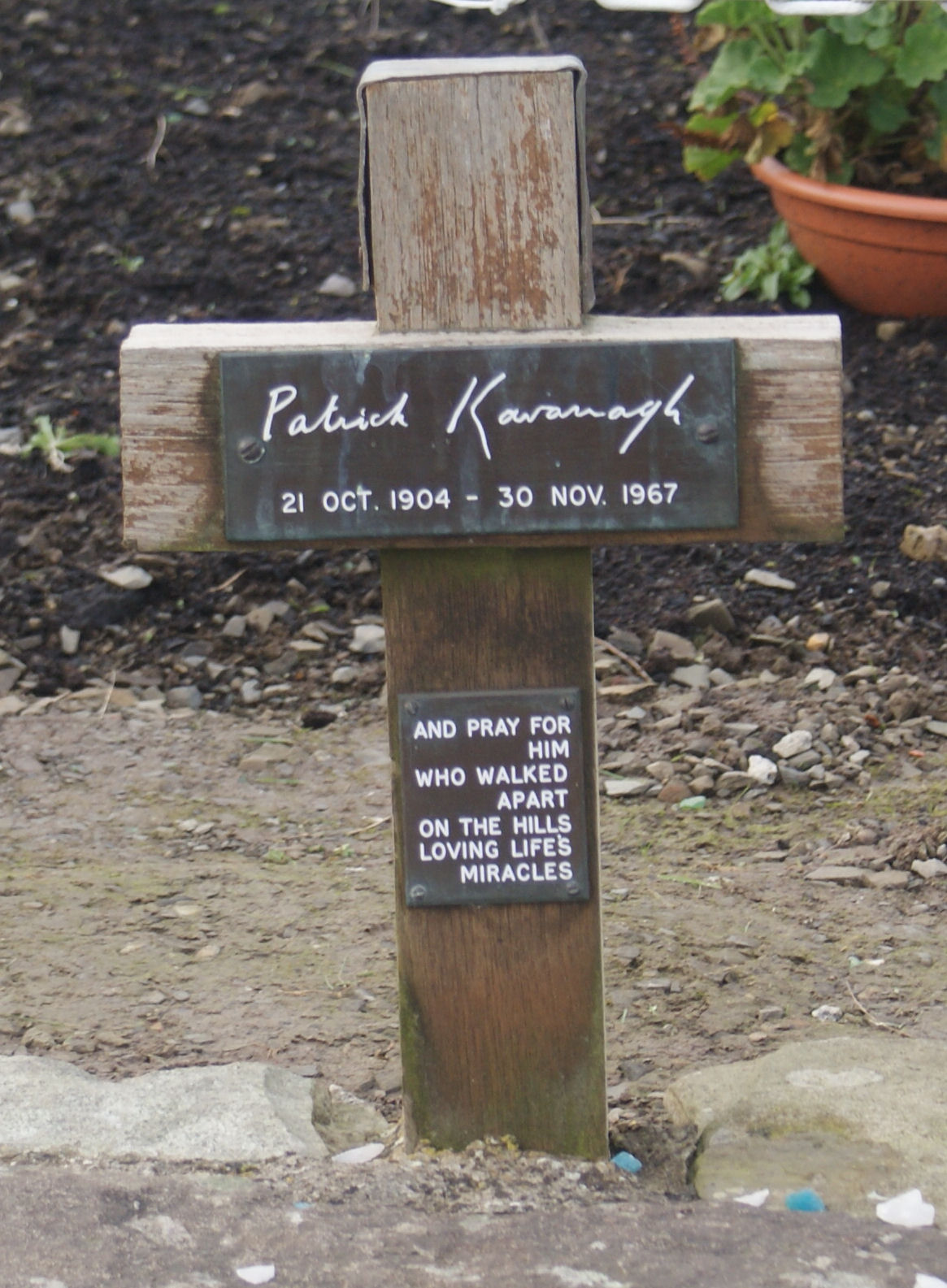
Kavanagh's Grave

The centre offers a tour of Kavanagh Country, containing many local sites associated with the poet and his work. It also has a Patrick Kavanagh Trail guide. The trail takes in sites some of which may be visited by the public, whilst others can be viewed from the roadside, these include: Norman Notte & Augustinian Monastery Folk Museum & Round Tower, Railway Bridge, Church of Mary Mother of Mercy Dance Hall at Mullaghinsha, Billy Brennan's Barn, Rocksavage Fort & The Triangular Field Slieve Gullion View, Drumcattan Church, Rocksavage Estate, Kednaminsha National School, Mc Enteggarts' Boarding House, House of The Wake, Cassidy's Hanging Hill, The Kavanagh Homestead.

The Monaghan Way a walking route starts from the centre and goes cross country to Castleblayney following the route of the Fane river and the old railway line.

== Patrick Kavanagh Poetry Award ==
The centre organises, jointly with the Patrick Kavanagh Society, the Patrick Kavanagh Poetry Award, which is presented each year for an unpublished collection of poems.

== Patrick Kavanagh Weekend ==
The annual Patrick Kavanagh Weekend takes place on the last weekend in November in the centre. It consists of a series of lectures usually on a central theme combined with musical entertainment and Drama. Keynote speakers have included Seamus Heaney, Antoinette Quinn, Brendan Kennelly, Gerald Dawe, Thomas McCarthy, Pat Boran Theo Dorgan, and Gabriel Rosenstock
