= Seán Cromien =

Irish senior civil servant

- Born: 20 October 1929; Dublin, Ireland
- Died: 6 August 2018 (aged 88); Dublin, Ireland
- Resting place: Glasnevin Cemetery
- Occupation: senior civil servant

Seán Patrick Cromien was an Irish senior civil servant who served as secretary general of the Department of Finance and Director of the National Library of Ireland.

== Early life and family ==
Seán Patrick Cromien was born in Dublin on October 20, 1929. He had two sisters, Marie Therese (who died at the age of two) and Aileen, and one brother named Thomas.

Cromien came from a prominent republican family. His mother, Margaret Morris, was a member of the Irish women's republican paramilitary group Cumann na mBan. His uncle on his father's side, John Cromien, was a member of the Irish Volunteers. John and Margaret had been in a romantic relationship in their youth. John was killed in the 1916 Easter Rising by a stray bullet that hit him as he walked down Prussia Street on his way to meet with his Irish Volunteer Company. Eleven years later, Margaret Morris married John's elder brother Thomas. The pair would go on to become Cromien's parents.

Cromien's upbringing was described as a “modest beginning” by Fr. Liam Ó Cuív at his funeral mass in 2018. He grew up in Fingal Place in Stoneybatter, located on the north side of Dublin's inner city. At that time, Stoneybatter was predominantly a working-class neighbourhood. Cromien's father worked as a cooper in Jameson's Distillery in Smithfield and had to retire early due to illness. He had hoped that Cromien would one day follow in his footsteps and also take up the profession.

However, Cromien's academic talents steered him down an alternative career path. He attended Saint Paul's Christian Brothers School on North Brunswick Street, where he stood out as a star student. He first sat his Leaving Certificate exams in 1946 and qualified for a university scholarship. As he was not yet seventeen, he was considered too young to attend university. He sat the Leaving Certificate again the following year, this time obtaining a Corporate scholarship. He subsequently attended University College Dublin, graduating in 1950 with a first-class honours degree in economics.

== Career ==
Seán Cromien spent his career working as a civil servant. In 1952, Cromien began his career working as an administrative officer for the Department of Finance. Throughout his career, Cromien worked to ensure that the Department of Finance created and enacted policy that would serve the public good. He worked toward improving the manner in which memos and official documents were written and in about 1987, Cromien became the Secretary General of Finance. During his time in this role, Cromien played a key role in revitalizing the Irish economy by reducing government spending. During his time as Secretary General of Finance, Cromien was a member of the Expenditure Review Committee, also known as An Bord Snip. This committee, established in the same year that Cromien became secretary, was created to look into ways in which the Irish government could cut spending. During this time, Cromien wrote several works on managing public funds and maintaining a budget. When Cromien took on the role of Secretary General of the Treasury, Ireland was on the brink of economic collapse, and much of the decision-making power of the Treasury department had been curtailed through its division into two separate departments. In his role as General Secretary, and as a member of An Bord Snip, Cromien fought off the recession through strategic budget cuts. Sean Cromien retired in 1994.

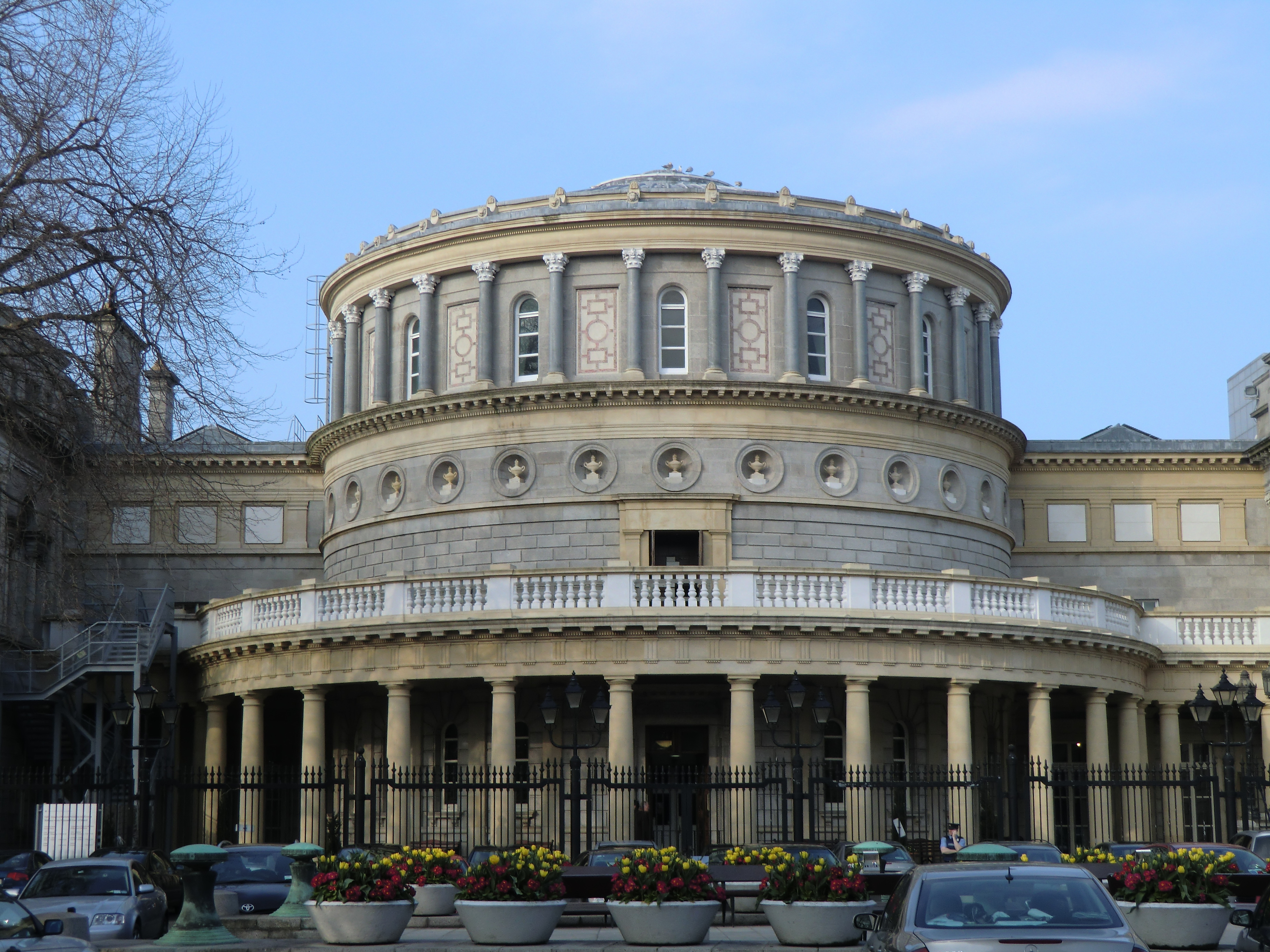
The National Library of Ireland, where Cromien worked for 6 months.

Following his retirement from the Department of Finance in 1994, Cromien remained an active public servant, taking on a variety of other roles in different organisations. For a period of 6 months in 1997 he served as the director of the National Library of Ireland after the retirement of his predecessor, Patricia Donlon, on health grounds. He also made a contribution to the National Library in the form of a donation of his own personal diaries which documented his career in the civil service. Having a keen interest in the natural world, Cromien also held the position of director of the Zoological Society of Ireland between 1998 and 2001 as well as serving as a member of the caretaker board of the National Museum of Ireland during that time. In 2006 he was elected as a chairman of the Royal Irish Academy, helping to oversee projects such as the Hunt Museum Evaluation group which sought to make the collections of the Hunt Museum in Limerick accessible online to the general public.

Following on from his work with the Department of Finance, Cromien continued to take an interest in issues regarding public spending well into his retirement, lending his financial expertise to reports such as the 2001 review of the Jeanie Johnston project and working for the Archdiocese of Dublin as a member of their finance committee. He also authored a report on another area of the civil service, the Department of Education. This report was a thorough critique of the administration of the Irish education system, in which he claimed 'the urgent [drove] out the important' and that inefficient administration was at the root of many of the system's shortcomings. This report went on to influence changes in the Department of Education as a government task force was formed in response to Cromien's criticisms and suggestions.

== Personal life and death ==
Cromien maintained many interests and hobbies outside of his career. It was once remarked that when he was not serving on boards, he could be found reading at home, swimming, or birdwatching.

Cromien was an amateur naturalist who maintained a lifelong passion for ornithology. He was once arrested in Romania in 1981, alongside his friend Tom Kilbane, for "pointing a telescope at a guarded power plant" in pursuit of sighting rare birds. He regarded fellow Irish naturalist and librarian Robert Lloyd Praeger as his hero. Like Praeger, Cromien catalogued many species of Irish plants and animals. He notably co-authored an article with James P. O'Connor about monarch butterfly sightings in Ireland for the Bulletin of the Irish Biogeographical Society.

Along with his interest in natural history, Cromien enjoyed cars. It is said that his favourite was the Triumph Stag.

Cromien was also a member and president of the Half Moon Swimming and Water Polo Club, and often swam with them at Dublin's Great South Wall.

Cromien was considered an eloquent writer and speaker. He read widely and was especially fond of the poetry of William Butler Yeats and Patrick Kavanagh. He penned a biography of James J. McElligott for the Royal Irish Academy's Dictionary of Irish Biography.

Cromien never married, and was regarded by others as being married to his work in the Department of Finance.

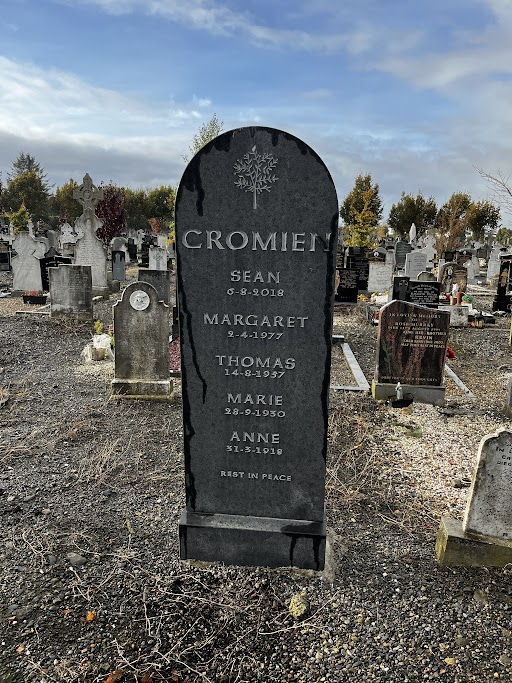
Sean Cromien's grave at Glasnevin Cemetery.

Cromien died peacefully in Glasnevin on 6 August 2018 at age 88 after a years-long battle with dementia. His funeral was held at St Brigid's Church in Killester, and was attended by many civil servants, including the former taoiseach Bertie Ahern. He is buried at Glasnevin Cemetery.

Cromien is generally remembered as an intellectual who worked his way up from a modest beginning to become a well-respected civil servant.
