= Minister for Emergency Services =

Minister for Emergency Services may refer to:

== Australia ==
- Minister for Emergency Services (New South Wales)
- Minister for Emergency Services (Western Australia)

== See also ==
- Ministry of Police
