= Cook Islands Biodiversity =

Cook Islands Biodiversity & Natural Heritage
- Cook Islands Biodiversity screenshot
- Website type: Biodiversity database
- Available in: English
- Owner: Bishop Museum
- Creator: Gerald McCormack
- Website: cookislands.bishopmuseum.org
- Commercial: No
- Registration: Free
- Launched: 8 March 2003
- Current status: Active

The Cook Islands Biodiversity website is a database with a collection of information on the plants and animals, native and non-native, found in the Cook Islands.

The collection of data and the development of the database on MS Access took more than a dozen years. The Bishop Museum (Honolulu), with support from PBIN, facilitated the programming of the database for the web and hosts the website. It was launched on 8 March 2003, reprogrammed and radically redesigned on 1 May 2005, and further developed 1 October 2005. In 2011 the Cook Islands Natural Heritage Trust enlisted expert computer specialists to redesign its extensive online biodiversity database.

This was an allocation over and above the Trust's basic budget, as outlined in its 2008–09 annual report, which was tabled in parliament by Prime Minister Henry Puna (also minister of National Environment Services).

The multimedia database is designed to integrate scientific and traditional information on all the plants and animals of the Cook Islands – native and non-native; terrestrial, marine, and freshwater. The database can use a range of criteria to display subsets of species for special interest groups. A species can be searched in Latin, English, or Cook Islands Māori.

The Cook Islands Natural Heritage Trust has a permanent research staff of one, Gerald McCormack, who has worked for the Cook Islands Government since 1980. In 1990 he became the director and researcher for the Cook Islands Natural Heritage Project – a trust since 1999. He is the lead developer of the Biodiversity Database, which is based on information from local and overseas experts, fieldwork and library research.

The website and its database are available on CD from the Natural Heritage Trust. A new CD is produced each year about mid-year.

== See also ==
- Category:Flora of the Cook Islands
- Category:Fauna of the Cook Islands
