= Cook Islands Natural Heritage Trust =

The Cook Islands Natural Heritage Trust (CINHT) is a programme of the Government of the Cook Islands to collect and integrate scientific and traditional information on local organisms (plants, animals and microbes) and related subjects (geology, ethnography etc.). The information can be accessed in the Cook Islands Biodiversity database. The programme and driving force behind the CINHT is Gerald McCormack. Originally the Cook Islands Natural Heritage Project, the programme came about when McCormack felt, in the course of his educational work, that there should be a list of the local flora and fauna available to locals. This modest goal expanded over the years and continues to expand with McCormack at the helm.

The Natural Heritage Project was initiated by Sir Geoffrey Henry within his Prime Minister's Department in 1990. The Project moved into the Natural Heritage Trust when it was established in 1999 by an Act of Parliament. At this time the project employed its first assistant, a taxonomic specialist graduate from New Zealand funded by the NZ Ministry of Foreign Affairs & Trade, and administered by Volunteer Service Abroad, to work with McCormack on identifying and entering species into the developing multimedia database of flora and fauna.

The primary funding for the trust and its database is from the Cook Islands Government. In addition, there has been essential funding from NZAID, Swiss Agency for Development and Cooperation, Bishop Museum, Pacific Basin Information Node, Global Environment Facility, and UNDP.

Gerald McCormack is Director of the Cook Islands Natural Heritage Trust and was coordinator of the project to transfer the Rimatara lorikeet (kura in Cook Islands Māori) to Atiu to establish a reserve population.
