= Colm McCarthy =

Colm McCarthy may refer to:

- Colm McCarthy (director) (born 1973), film director
- Colm McCarthy (economist), economist at University College Dublin
