= Department of Police (disambiguation) =

Department of Police may refer to a police department, or specifically to:

- Department of Police (South Africa)
- Department of Police, Delhi (India)
- Ministry of Police (disambiguation)
