= 2024 Cook Islands local elections =

- 15 August 2024
- Registered: 2,532
- Turnout: >2,200 (>90%)
- 10 mayors and 55 councillors
Party	Seats	+/–
Mayors
Independent	10	
Councillors
Independent	52	
vacant	3	
This lists parties that won seats. See the complete results below.
Map showing party affiliation

The 2024 Cook Islands local elections were quadrennial elections held primarily on 15 August 2024 to elect mayors and councillors to the country's island governments. All 10 outer islands participated in the elections. No elections were held in the country's main population centre, Rarotonga, as it does not have any local government.

== Key dates ==
Key dates relating to the local elections are as follows:

13 August	Voting held on Nassau island
15 August	Main election day – polling open from 9am to 6pm on most islands
16 August	Preliminary results released
22 August	Final results announced

== Summary ==
=== Mayoral elections ===
Island	Incumbent	Elected	Runner-up	Details	Refs
Aitutaki	Tekura Bishop (Ind)	Nick Henry (Ind)	Tekura Bishop (Ind)	Details	
Mangaia	Makitua Tutai (Ind)	Ngateina Rani (Ind)	Makitua Tutai (Ind)	Details	
Atiu	Nooroa Paratainga (Ind)	Timaau Mokorow (Ind)	Nooroa Paratainga (Ind)	Details	
Mauke	? (?)	Joanne Stephens (Ind)	Teahui Tauu (Ind)	Details	
Mitiaro	Makara Murare (Ind)	Tati Tutaka (Ind)	Makara Murare (Ind)	Details	
Palmerston	? (?)	Bob Marsters (Ind)	unopposed	Details	
Manihiki	Ngamata Napara (Ind)	Joseph Hiro (Ind)	Ngamata Napara (Ind)	Details	
Penrhyn	Rangitava Taia (Ind)		Noo Marsters (Ind)	Details	
Pukapuka-Nassau	Levi Walewaoa (Ind)		unopposed	Details	
Rakahanga	Taaunga Tuteru (Ind)		unopposed	Details	

== Aitutaki ==
2024 Aitutaki Island Government election
- 15 August 2024
- Registered: 1,102
- Turnout: 970 (88.02%)
- Mayoral election
Candidate	Nick Henry	Tekura Bishop	Charlie Taamo
Party	Independent	Independent	Independent
Popular vote	379	333	258
Percentage	39.07%	34.33%	26.60%
Mayor before election
Tekura Bishop
Independent
Elected mayor
Nick Henry
Independent
- Council election
- 9 of 14 seats on the Aitutaki Island Council; 7 seats needed for a majority
Party	Seats	+/–
Independent	9	
This lists parties that won seats. See the complete results below.

=== Mayoral ===
2025 Aitutaki mayoral election
Party	Candidate	Votes	%	±%
Independent	Nick Henry	379	39.07	
Independent	Tekura Bishop^{†}	333	34.33	
Independent	Charlie Taamo	258	26.60	
Turnout		970	88.02	
Registered electors		1,102		
^{†} incumbent

=== Amuri ===
Amuri constituency
Party	Candidate	Votes	%	±%
Independent	Mantangaro Isamaela	elected unopposed		
Registered electors		245		

=== Ureia ===
Ureia constituency
Party	Candidate	Votes	%	±%
Independent	Terangi Ngaoire-Natua	78	80.41	
Independent	Maao-Tino Pere	19	19.59	
Turnout		97	101.04	
Registered electors		96		

=== Arutanga ===
Arutanga constituency
Party	Candidate	Votes	%	±%
Independent	Tikiteina Tikiteina	61	64.89	
Independent	John Purua	19	20.21	
Turnout		94	77.69	
Registered electors		121		

=== Reureu ===
Reureu constituency
Party	Candidate	Votes	%	±%
Independent	Geri Toki	elected unopposed		
Registered electors		93		

=== Nikaupara ===
Nikaupara constituency
Party	Candidate	Votes	%	±%
Independent	Metuakore Strickland	71	54.20	
Independent	Metuakore Tschan	41	31.30	
Independent	Tereapii Simona	19	14.50	
Turnout		131	84.52	
Registered electors		155		

=== Vaipae ===
Vaipae constituency
Party	Candidate	Votes	%	±%
Independent	Ruautu Ngatokoa	elected unopposed		
Registered electors		215		

=== Tautu ===
Tautu constituency
Party	Candidate	Votes	%	±%
Independent	Twin Ruarangi	elected unopposed		
Registered electors		127		

=== Vaipeka ===
Vaipeka constituency
Party	Candidate	Votes	%	±%
Independent	Ngatokorua Kamoe	50	66.67	
Independent	Tuangaru Bishop	25	33.33	
Turnout		75	150.00	
Registered electors		50		

== Mangaia ==
2024 Mangaia Island Government election
- 15 August 2024
- Registered: 321
- Turnout: 300 (93.46%)
- Mayoral election
Candidate	Ngateina Rani	Makitua Tutai
Party	Independent	Independent
Popular vote	153	147
Percentage	51.00%	49.00%
Mayor before election
Makitua Tutai
Independent
Elected mayor
Ngateina Rani
Independent
- Council election
- 7 of 12 seats on the Mangaia Island Council; 7 seats needed for a majority
Party	Seats	+/–
Independent	6	
vacant	1	
This lists parties that won seats. See the complete results below.

=== Mayoral ===
Mangaia constituency
Party	Candidate	Votes	%	±%
Independent	Ngateina Rani	153	51.00	
Independent	Makitua Tutai^{†}	147	49.00	
Turnout		300	93.46	
Registered electors		321		
Independent gain from Independent				
^{†} incumbent

=== Karanga ===
Karanga constituency
Party	Candidate	Votes	%	±%
Independent	Harris Ngai	19	55.88	
Independent	Mairiroimata Teuira	15	44.12	
Turnout		34	100.00	
Registered electors		34		

=== Ivirua ===
Ivirua constituency
Party	Candidate	Votes	%	±%
Independent	Upokoongo Tairea	19	50.00	
Independent	Pirimetua Uakino	19	50.00	
Turnout		38	88.37	
Registered electors		43		

=== Tavaenga ===
Tavaenga constituency
Party	Candidate	Votes	%	±%
Independent	Tutai Tutai	elected unopposed		
Registered electors		75		

=== Veitatei ===
Veitatei constituency
Party	Candidate	Votes	%	±%
Independent	Maire Kareroa	elected unopposed		
Registered electors		58		

=== Keia ===
Keia constituency
Party	Candidate	Votes	%	±%
Independent	Mini Dean	elected unopposed		
Registered electors		66		

=== Tamarua ===
Tamarua constituency
Party	Candidate	Votes	%	±%
Independent	Ngaupoko Metuakore	elected unopposed		
Registered electors		45		

== Atiu ==
2024 Atiu Island Government election
- 15 August 2024
- Registered: 239
- Turnout: 232 (97.07%)
- Mayoral election
Candidate	Timaau Mokoroa	Nooroa Paratainga	Tereapii Porio
Party	Independent	Independent	Independent
Popular vote	79	53	53
Percentage	34.05%	22.84%	22.84%
Candidate	Tuainekore Samuel	Makitua Boaza
Party	Independent	Independent
Popular vote	32	15
Percentage	13.79%	6.47%
Mayor before election
Nooroa Paratainga
Cook Islands United
Elected mayor
Timaau Mokoroa
Independent
- Council election
- 6 of 12 seats on the Atiu Island Council; 7 seats needed for a majority
Party	Seats	+/–
Independent	6	
This lists parties that won seats. See the complete results below.

=== Mayoral ===
2024 Atiu mayoral election
Party	Candidate	Votes	%	±%
Independent	Timaau Mokoroa	79	34.05	
Independent	Nooroa Paratainga^{†}	53	22.84	
Independent	Tereapii Porio	53	22.84	
Independent	Tuainekore Samuel	32	22.84	
Independent	Makitua Boaza	15	6.47	
Turnout		232	97.07	
Registered electors		239		
Independent gain from Independent				
^{†} incumbent

=== Teenui ===
Teenui constituency
Party	Candidate	Votes	%	±%
Independent	Tinga Arai Kutia	elected unopposed		
Registered electors		62		

=== Mapumai ===
Mapumai constituency
Party	Candidate	Votes	%	±%
Independent	Ezekiela Patukura	36	76.60	
Independent	Teremoana Windy	11	23.40	
Turnout		47	88.68	
Registered electors		53		

=== Tengatangi ===
Tengatangi constituency
Party	Candidate	Votes	%	±%
Independent	Tearikiemaemarangi Teiotu	elected unopposed		
Registered electors		26		

=== Areora ===
Areora constituency
Party	Candidate	Votes	%	±%
Independent	Teaumarae Glassie	64	71.91	
Independent	Vainetutai Boaza	25	28.09	
Turnout		89	105.95	
Registered electors		84		

=== Ngatiarua ===
Ngatiarua constituency
Party	Candidate	Votes	%	±%
Independent	Vainerere Touna	8	61.54	
Independent	Teura Maka Kea	5	38.46	
Turnout		13	92.86	
Registered electors		14		

== Mauke ==
2024 Mauke Island Government election
- 15 August 2024
- Registered: 218
- Turnout: 190 (87.16%)
- Mayoral election
Candidate	Joanne Stephens	Teahui Tauu	Frances Taoro
Party	Independent	Independent	Independent
Popular vote	53	43	42
Percentage	27.89%	22.63%	22.11%
Candidate	Lucky Vainetutai	Makituke Aberahama	Christopher Leahy
Party	Independent	Independent	Independent
Popular vote	27	13	12
Percentage	14.21%	6.84%	6.32%
Elected mayor
Joanne Stephens
Independent
- Council election
- 6 of 11 seats on the Mauke Island Council; 6 seats needed for a majority
Party	Seats	+/–
Independent	6	
This lists parties that won seats. See the complete results below.

=== Mayoral ===
2024 Mauke mayoral election
Party	Candidate	Votes	%	±%
Independent	Joanne Stephens	53	27.89	
Independent	Teahui Tauu	43	22.63	
Independent	Frances Taoro	42	22.11	
Independent	Lucky Vainetutai	27	14.21	
Independent	Makituke Aberahama	13	6.84	
Independent	Christopher Leahy	12	6.32	
Turnout		190	87.16	
Registered electors		218		

=== Avaavaroa ===
Avaavaroa constituency
Party	Candidate	Votes	%	±%
Independent	Ngatokoa Matapo	30	56.60	
Independent	Tepaeru Samuela-Dyer	23	43.40	
Turnout		53	84.13	
Registered electors		63		

=== Parai ===
Parai constituency
Party	Candidate	Votes	%	±%
Independent	Vainetutai Oti	elected unopposed		
Registered electors		18		

=== Makatea ===
Makatea constituency
Party	Candidate	Votes	%	±%
Independent	Arapo Urarii	19	54.29	
Independent	Tepaeru Samuela-Dyer	16	45.71	
Turnout		35	94.59	
Registered electors		37		

=== Areora ===
Areora constituency
Party	Candidate	Votes	%	±%
Independent	Motoro Akamoeau	elected unopposed		
Registered electors		45		

=== Ngatiarua ===
Ngatiarua constituency
Party	Candidate	Votes	%	±%
Independent	Ngarue Tuakanangaro	40	81.63	
Independent	Pickering Taripo	9	18.37	
Turnout		49	89.09	
Registered electors		55		

== Mitiaro ==
2024 Mitiaro Island Government election
- 15 August 2024
- Registered: 97
- Turnout: 89 (91.75%)
- Mayoral election
Candidate	Tati Tutaka	Makara Murare
Party	Independent	Independent
Popular vote	46	39
Percentage	51.69%	43.82%
Mayor before election
Makara Murare
Independent
Elected mayor
Tati Tutaka
Independent
- Council election
- 5 of 10 seats on the Mitiaro Island Council; 6 seats needed for a majority
Party	Seats	+/–
Independent	5	
This lists parties that won seats. See the complete results below.

=== Mayoral ===
2024 Mitiaro mayoral election
Party	Candidate	Votes	%	±%
Independent	Tati Tutaka	46	93.88	
Independent	Makara Murare^{†}	39	43.82	
Independent	Toru Ngatoko	4	4.49	
Turnout		89	91.75	
Registered electors		97		
Independent gain from Independent				
^{†} incumbent

=== Atai ===
Atai constituency
Party	Candidate	Votes	%	±%
Independent	Tokai Ngaiorae	54	60.67	
Independent	Alma Pukeiti	35	39.33	
Turnout		89	240.54	
Registered electors		37		

=== Takaue ===
Takaue constituency
Party	Candidate	Votes	%	±%
Independent	Toa Inatea	51	57.95	
Independent	Upokotunoa Murare	37	42.05	
Turnout		88	325.93	
Registered electors		27		

=== Mangarei ===
Mangarei constituency
Party	Candidate	Votes	%	±%
Independent	Maarametua Kimiora	elected unopposed		
Registered electors		20		

=== Auta ===
Auta constituency
Party	Candidate	Votes	%	±%
Independent	Brandon Kaukura	elected unopposed		
Registered electors		13		

== Palmerston ==
The mayor and councillors are chosen by the three main family lines of Palmerston Island (being the Matavia, Akakaingaro, and Tepou Tenioi lines), with the mayor position rotating between the three.

Family line	Person	Role appointed to
Matavia	Bob Marsters	Mayor
Matavia	Tupou Marsters	Councillor
Akakaingaro	Arthur Neale	Councillor
Akakaingaro	Juliana Marsters	Councillor
Tepou Tenioi	Taepae Marsters	Deputy mayor
Tepou Tenioi	Simon Marsters	Councillor

== Manihiki ==
2024 Manihiki Island Government election
- 15 August 2024
- Registered: 147
- Turnout: 115 (78.23%)
- Mayoral election
Candidate	Joseph Hiro	Ngamata Napara
Party	Independent	Independent
Popular vote	46	50
Percentage	56.52%	43.48%
Mayor before election
Makara Murare
Independent
Elected mayor
Tati Tutaka
Independent
- Council election
- 7 of 10 seats on the Manihiki Island Council; 6 seats needed for a majority
Party	Seats	+/–
Independent	7	
This lists parties that won seats. See the complete results below.

=== Mayoral ===
2024 Manihiki mayoral election
Party	Candidate	Votes	%	±%
Independent	Joseph Hiro	65	56.52	
Independent	Ngamata Napara^{†}	50	43.48	
Turnout		115	78.23	
Registered electors		147		
Independent gain from Independent				
^{†} incumbent

=== Tauhunu ===
Tauhunu constituency
Party	Candidate	Votes	%	±%
Independent	John McLeod	49		
Independent	Wireless Pupuke	40		
Independent	Daniel Tuteru	39		
Independent	John Koteka	36		
Turnout				
Registered electors		95		

=== Tukao ===
Tukao constituency
Party	Candidate	Votes	%	±%
Independent	James Kareroa	41		
Independent	Pepe Makira	34		
Independent	Trainee Samson	33		
Independent	Mareta Tarau	28		
Turnout				
Registered electors		52		

== Penrhyn ==
2024 Penrhyn Island Government election
- 15 August 2024
- Registered: 105
- Turnout: 96 (91.43%)
- Mayoral election
Candidate	Rangitava Taia	Noo Marsters	Puremana Teika
Party	Independent	Independent	Independent
Popular vote	36	35	25
Percentage	37.50%	36.46%	26.04%
Mayor before election
Rangitava Taia
Independent
Elected mayor
Rangitava Taia
Independent
- Council election
- 6 of 9 seats on the Penrhyn Island Council; 5 seats needed for a majority
Party	Seats	+/–
Independent	4	
vacant	2	
This lists parties that won seats. See the complete results below.

=== Mayoral ===
2024 Penrhyn mayoral election
Party	Candidate	Votes	%	±%
Independent	Rangitava Taia^{†}	36	37.50	
Independent	Noo Marsters	35	36.46	
Independent	Puremana Teika	25	26.04	
Turnout		96	91.43	
Registered electors		105		
Independent hold				
^{†} incumbent

=== Omoka ===
Omoka constituency
Party	Candidate	Votes	%	±%
Independent	Teheva Viniki	28		
Independent	Papa William	25		
Independent	Tauivanannga Niukore	22		
Independent	Ngereteina George	21		
Independent	Ru Taime	21		
Independent	Kaiatia Rongo-Hatorangi	17		
Independent	Mahutamaru Akatapuria	17		
Independent	Tahiri Matara	17		
Independent	Petero Mamia	13		
Independent	Turoa Tuaine	13		
Independent	Tepangoa Tekena	12		
Independent	Alfred William	10		
Turnout				
Registered electors		85		

=== Tetautua ===
Tetautua constituency
Party	Candidate	Votes	%	±%
Independent	Matara Akatapuria	11		
Independent	Teika Faira	9		
Independent	Warland Solo	9		
Turnout				
Registered electors		20		

== Pukapuka-Nassau ==
2024 Pukapuka-Nassau Island Government election
- 13 & 15 August 2024
- Registered: 251
- Mayoral election
Candidate	Levi Walewaoa
Party	Independent
Popular vote	Unopposed
Mayor before election
Levi Walewaoa
Independent
Elected mayor
Levi Walewaoa
Independent
- Council election
- 7 of 10 seats on the Pukapuka-Nassau Island Council; 6 seats needed for a majority
Party	Seats	+/–
Independent	7	
This lists parties that won seats. See the complete results below.

=== Mayoral ===
2024 Pukapuka-Nassau mayoral election
Party	Candidate	Votes	%	±%
Independent	Levi Walewaoa^{†}	elected unopposed		
Registered electors		105		
^{†} incumbent

=== Ngake ===
Ngake constituency
Party	Candidate	Votes	%	±%
Independent	Tokumanako Amosa	73		
Independent	Inuvai Ngarupe	65		
Independent	Kauwi Dariu	35		
Independent	Witipayi Nimeti	31		
Turnout				
Registered electors		98		

=== Yato ===
Yato constituency
Party	Candidate	Votes	%	±%
Independent	Tapaanga Mataora	elected unopposed		
Independent	Tinokura Tutau	elected unopposed		
Registered electors		66		

=== Roto ===
Roto constituency
Party	Candidate	Votes	%	±%
Independent	Teiho Teiho-Tua	76		
Independent	Teotau Teopenga	60		
Independent	Pero Dariu	36		
Turnout				
Registered electors		87		

== Rakahanga ==
2024 Rakahanga Island Government election
- 15 August 2024
- Registered: 52
- Mayoral election
Candidate	Taaunga Tuteru
Party	Independent
Popular vote	Unopposed
Mayor before election
Taaunga Tuteru
Independent
Elected mayor
Taaunga Tuteru
Independent
- Council election
- 6 of 9 seats on the Rakahanga Island Council; 5 seats needed for a majority
Party	Seats	+/–
Independent	6	
This lists parties that won seats. See the complete results below.

=== Mayoral ===
2024 Rakahanga mayoral election
Party	Candidate	Votes	%	±%
Independent	Taaunga Tuteru^{†}	elected unopposed		
Registered electors		52		
^{†} incumbent

=== Purapoto ===
Purapoto constituency
Party	Candidate	Votes	%	±%
Independent	Taunga Hagai	elected unopposed		
Registered electors		8		

=== Niteiri ===
Niteiri constituency
Party	Candidate	Votes	%	±%
Independent	Apolonari Piho	elected unopposed		
Registered electors		20		

=== Numahanga ===
Numahanga constituency
Party	Candidate	Votes	%	±%
Independent	Tokamokoha Tupou	33	78.57	
Independent	Kare-Mangi Tarau	9	21.43	
Turnout		42	466.67	
Registered electors		9		

=== Teruakiore ===
Teruakiore constituency
Party	Candidate	Votes	%	±%
Independent	Tuatangi Aratangi	elected unopposed		
Registered electors		11		

=== Matara ===
Matara constituency
Party	Candidate	Votes	%	±%
Independent	Hagai Teanini	elected unopposed		
Registered electors		4		
