= Moore McDowell =

Irish economist and university lecturer

Moore McDowell is an Irish economist and university lecturer. A writer on economics and public finances, he is a regular contributor in the Irish media on the subject of economics.

McDowell is the eldest son of Anthony McDowell, a barrister and civil servant, and Eilis MacNeill (daughter of the leader of the Irish Volunteers, Eoin MacNeill). His younger brother is the politician Senator Michael McDowell.

McDowell studied at University College Dublin (UCD), and was awarded a Research Fellowship from the Economic and Social Research Institute (ESRI) to study at Worcester College, Oxford, from 1967 to 1969. He was one of the economists along with Sean Barrett and Colm McCarthy, nicknamed the 'Doheny & Nesbitt School of Economics', who were closely identified with the early policies of the Progressive Democrats.
