= Mayors in the Cook Islands =

Mayors each lead an island government (pictured)

Mayors in the Cook Islands are the directly elected leaders of the country's island governments (kavamani enua) for the Outer Islands (pa enua). They chair island government council meetings and have the ability to appoint a deputy mayor. Their constitutional role, as laid out in the Island Government Act 2012-13, is to provide good leadership for their island and council. Mayors are elected using the first-past-the-post voting system.

There are currently 10 mayors. The country's main population centre, the island of Rarotonga, does not have any local government and thus has no mayors; the country's uninhabited islands also don't have mayors.

== Powers and responsibilities ==
The powers and responsibilities of mayors are outlined in the Island Government Act 2012-13. Previously, the relevant legislation was the Outer Islands Local Government Act 1987 and related amendment acts. Mayors must ensure island government business is conducted in an open and public manner with clear objectives. Mayors must provide good leadership for their island and ensure that council resolutions are implemented when required. They must foster co-operation with the national government as well as pursue economic prosperity.

After being elected, mayors must arrange for a meeting of the Aronga Mana of the island at which they will appoint from amongst themselves someone (who is not an ariki) to serve on the relevant island government. The mayor may also appoint from amongst the elected councillors a deputy mayor, who will act as the mayor in their absence when required.

Mayors set the time, date, and place of ordinary meetings of the island government. Mayors must also convene special meetings when requested by the relevant government minister, any MP who is a member of said island government, or at least 2 island councillors. Mayors chair meetings of the island government, and must appoint (with majority consent) a clerk to take a written record of said meetings. Mayors act as tie breakers when needed.

== Elections ==
Local government elections are held every four years. Mayors are elected at-large. The most recent nation-wide local elections were held in 2024; a by-election was held in Mangaia in 2025.

On the island of Palmerston, the role of mayor rotates between the heads of the three main families and is thus not directly elected.

== Term of office ==
Mayors hold office from the date of public notice of their election win to the date of the public notice of the election win of their successor unless otherwise disqualified earlier. A mayor can be disqualified from office for reasons such as becoming a member of Parliament, taking an oath of allegiance to a foreign country, becoming mentally unstable, being convicted of a crime punishable by three or more months of imprisonment, being convicted of a corrupt practice, dying, leaving their island for a period of one or more months without the approval of the relevant island government council, or resignation. A mayor's tenure ends on the date of the happening of the disqualifying event. Electors can also petition for the mayor's office to be declared vacant.

== List of current mayors ==
Island	Mayor	Party	Elected	Population
Aitutaki	Nick Henry	None	2024	1,782
Pukapuka and Nassau	Levi Walewaoa	None		548
Mangaia	Makitua Tutai	None	2025	471
Atiu	Timaau Mokoroa	None	2024	383
Mauke	Joanne Stephens	None	2024	249
Penrhyn	Rangitava Taia	None		233
Manihiki	Joseph Hiro	None	2024	215
Mitiaro	Tati Tutaka	None	2024	155
Rakahanga	Taunga Tuteru	None		81
Palmerston	Bob Marsters	None	2024	25

== Notable mayors ==
=== Joanne Stephens ===
Stephens is the country's first transgender mayor, having been elected in 2024 as the mayor of Mauke.
