= Government of the Cook Islands =

Self-governing parliamentary democracy

Cook Islands Government
- Central government

Overview
- Established: 1965
- Country: Cook Islands
- Leader: Prime Minister of the Cook Islands (Mark Brown)
- Appointed by: King's Representative (Tom Marsters) on the advice of the prime minister
- Main organ: Cabinet of the Cook Islands
- Responsible to: Cook Islands Legislative Assembly

The Cook Islands Government is the central government through which political authority is exercised in the Cook Islands, a self-governing parliamentary democracy in free association with New Zealand. As in most other parliamentary democracies, the term "Government" refers chiefly to the executive branch, and more specifically to the collective ministry directing the executive. The executive consists of the prime minister, cabinet ministers and other ministers of state who command the support of a majority of the members of the parliament and also includes the departments and other executive bodies that ministers oversee.

Unlike other Commonwealth Realms, the Cook Islands Cabinet has a formal legislative basis in the Cook Islands Constitution. Cabinet consists of the Prime Minister and up to six other ministers. Members are appointed by the King's Representative on advice of the Prime Minister, and must be Members of Parliament.

Avarua in Rarotonga, the largest and most populous island in the Cook Islands, is the seat of government.

The Cook Islands has a governance framework shaped by its history, culture, and political evolution. The country has navigated a transition from traditional leadership to colonial administration and, ultimately, to self-governance. Central to this transformation is the Cook Islands Constitution Act 1964, which formalised self-rule while preserving traditional governance practices.

Cultural values, including communal decision-making and the advisory role of the House of Ariki, remain integral to public administration.

== Governance history ==
The governance history of the Cook Islands reflects a dynamic interplay of tradition and external influences. Historically, decision-making was guided by ariki (chiefs), who governed through consensus and communal practices. This system was deeply rooted in Polynesian culture and continues to influence governance today through the House of Ariki, established under Part 1 S8 – 11B of the Constitution.

The arrival of missionaries in the 19th century brought significant cultural and administrative changes, introducing Christian principles that reshaped governance. Traditional laws were aligned with Christian teachings, such as the implementation of "Blue Laws" to regulate societal behaviour. These "Blue Laws" were introduced by the Reverend John Williams. He adapted a version of the Raʻiātea Code of Laws to regulate the conduct of the peoples of Rarotonga.

In 1888, the Cook Islands became a British protectorate, leading to external administrative control. This transitioned to New Zealand's jurisdiction in 1901, following annexation. Governance was formalised with the establishment of the Resident Commissioner in 1891 and the Legislative Council in 1946, which marked the beginning of Cook Islands' legislative autonomy.

Self-governance was achieved in 1965 under the Cook Islands Constitution Act 1964 (Parliamentary Counsel Office, 1964). This Act defined the country's administrative and political structures while maintaining free association with New Zealand for defence and foreign affairs. Since independence, constitutional amendments have incorporated traditional leadership and adapted to evolving governance needs. The establishment of the Pa Enua Governance Division further decentralised administration, fostering localised service delivery.

The head of state of the Cook Islands is King Charles III. The King's Representative is Sir Tom Marsters. The King's Representative fulfills the role of a Governor-General and is responsible for appointing the Prime Minister and the Cabinet, in addition to chairing the Executive Council. Prior to 1982 this role was undertaken by the High Commissioner of New Zealand, however these powers were repatriated.

== Cultural context ==
The Cook Islands' governance system integrates traditional leadership and cultural values with modern administrative frameworks. The House of Ariki, comprising traditional leaders, advises on matters related to welfare and culture. This ensures that policymaking respects indigenous traditions, blending them with contemporary governance practices.

The Pa Enua Governance Division plays a critical role in bridging traditional and contemporary governance. This division coordinates local administration, involving elected officials, traditional leaders, and community representatives to ensure inclusive decision-making.

Communal decision-making remains a cornerstone of Cook Islands culture, influencing governance at all levels. These practices promote collaboration and inclusivity, ensuring that public sector management reflects community priorities. However, balancing these traditions with the efficiency demands of bureaucratic systems presents an ongoing challenge.

== Central government ==
The governance framework is anchored in parliamentary sovereignty, with a unicameral legislature comprising 24 members. The Executive Council is the supreme decision-making body of Government and comprises the King's Representative (as Chair) and all Cabinet Ministers which includes the Prime Minister. The Prime Minister and Cabinet are responsible for policy implementation, while the legislature provides oversight.

=== Current composition ===
As of 8 February 2024, the Cook Islands Cabinet consists of:

Cabinet ministers

| Incumbent | Portfolios and responsibilities | Since |
|---|---|---|
| Mark Brown (Cook Islands Party) | Prime Minister; Attorney General; Minister responsible for the Office of the Prime Minister; Minister responsible for the Public Service Commission; Minister of Police; Minister of Finance; Minister of Economic Development; Minister responsible for the Seabed Minerals Authority; Minister of Tourism; Minister of Energy and Renewable Energy; Minister of Outer Islands Special Projects; Minister of Telecommunications | 1 June 2020 |
| Albert Nicholas (Cook Islands Party) | Deputy Prime Minister; Minister of Infrastructure Cook Islands; Minister responsible for the Business Trade and Investment Board; Minister responsible for National Environment Services; Minister responsible for the Cook Islands Investment Corporation; Minister of Transport | 16 February 2024 |
| Rose Toki-Brown (Independent) | Minister of Health; Minister of Agriculture; Minister responsible for Cook Islands National Superannuation; Minister of Internal Affairs | 2 June 2021 |
| Vaine Mokoroa (Cook Islands Party) | Minister of Youth and Sports; Ombudsman; Minister of Education; Minister responsible for the Financial Supervisory Commission; Minister responsible for the Financial Services Development Authority; Minister of Audit; Minister responsible for the Public Expenditure Review Committee; Minister of Justice | 2 June 2021 |
| George Angene (Cook Islands Party) | Minister of Corrective Services; Minister of Culture; Minister responsible for the House of Ariki; Minister responsible for the Punanga Nui; Minister responsible for the Head of State | 10 July 2018 |
| Tingika Elikana (Cook Islands Party) | Minister of Foreign Affairs; Minister of Immigration; Minister of Marine Resources; Minister of Parliamentary Services | 31 January 2024 |

== Local government ==
=== Island government ===
Island government areas

Local government in the Cook Islands comprises Island governments under the Pa Enua framework. An island government is a council established under the 2012-13 Island Government Act. The objects of this Act are to:

- Foster good governance by all island governments.
- Promote accountability of island governments to their island communities.
- Encourage community participation in the governance of each island through transparency and consultation.
- Encourage island governments and the island community to progressively assume responsibilities as and when they are able to do so.
- Enable island governments and their island communities to decide on how best to promote the social, economic, cultural and environmental well-being of the respective islands.

The Act establishes an island government on each island, apart from Rarotonga.

There are island councils on all of the inhabited outer islands (Outer Islands Local Government Act 1987 with amendments up to 2004, and Palmerston Island Local Government Act 1993) except Nassau, which is governed by Pukapuka (Suwarrow, with only one caretaker living on the island, also governed by Pukapuka, is not counted with the inhabited islands in this context).

The members of each island government comprise elected members consisting of a mayor and councillors, appointed members consisting of traditional leaders or representative, religious representative and members of parliament. The later 3 are ex-officio members of the island government.

The island government may also be known as Kavamani Enua or any other term prescribed by regulations made under the Island Government Act.

The ten island councils in the outer islands
| Aitutaki (including uninhabited Manuae) |
| Atiu (including uninhabited Takutea) |
| Mangaia |
| Manihiki |
| Mauke |
| Mitiaro |
| Palmerston |
| Penrhyn |
| Pukapuka (including Nassau and Suwarrow) |
| Rakahanga |

=== Vaka councils ===
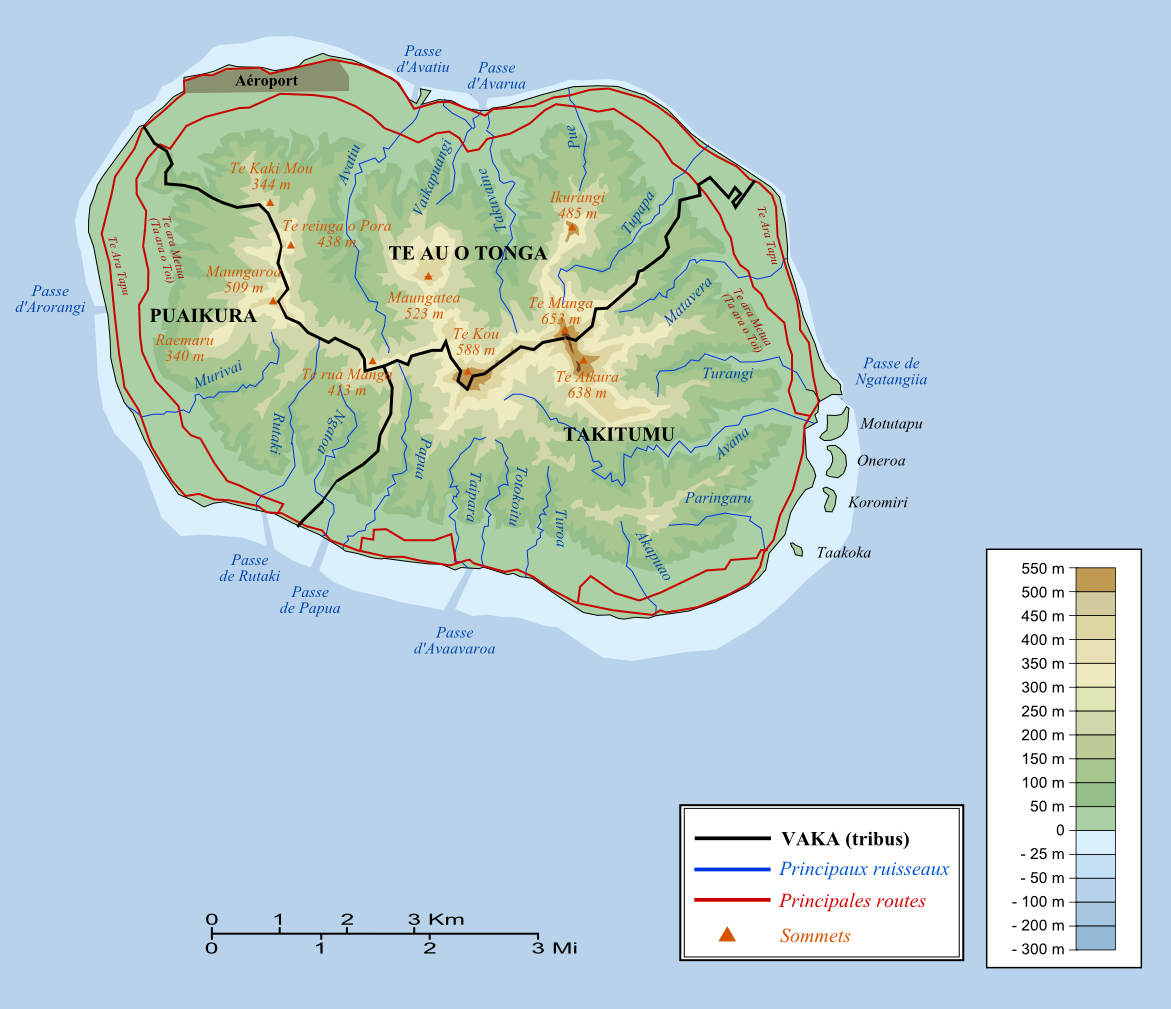
Vaka councils of Rarotonga, 1997–2008

Three vaka councils headed by mayors were established on Rarotonga by the Rarotonga Local Government Act 1997, then abolished in February 2008, despite much controversy.

Vaka councils of Rarotonga, 1997–2008
| Vaka | Districts |
|---|---|
| Puaikura | Arorangi |
| Takitumu | Matavera, Ngatangiia, Takitumu |
| Te-Au-O-Tonga | Equivalent to Avarua, the country's capital |

=== Village committees ===
On the lowest level, there are village committees. Nassau, which is governed by Pukapuka, has an island committee (Nassau Island Committee), which advises the Pukapuka Island Council on matters concerning its own island.

== Challenges ==
The Cook Islands face persistent governance challenges, including political patronage, which undermines public sector neutrality. External funding dependencies further exacerbate vulnerabilities, limiting the country's ability to achieve full economic independence. Decentralisation efforts through the Pa Enua Governance Division have been successful in some areas but have also faced capacity constraints, leading to the re-centralisation of certain functions

=== Implications for public sector management ===
The Cook Islands' governance framework demonstrates the importance of integrating traditional leadership and cultural practices into modern administrative systems. The Pa Enua Governance Division serves as a model for localised governance, addressing the unique challenges of geographic dispersion and resource limitations. While external dependencies and political patronage remain significant obstacles, the Cook Islands offer valuable lessons for other Small Island Developing States (SIDS) seeking to balance tradition and modernity in governance.

=== Public sector reform and capacity building in small island developing states ===
The public sector in SIDS, including thee Cook Islands, was initially considered to be bloated and inefficient by the World Bank. However, more recent literature acknowledges that small states invest considerable financial and human resources relative to their GDP in order to deliver public services to small populations. Moreover, the public sector is the main employer in many SIDS and compensates for low capacity within the private sector.

New public management reforms, which focused on rightsizing the public sector, were introduced in the 1990s. There is little evidence on the success of these reforms, although Hassall suggests that they were generally resisted. Hence, the public sector remains relatively large in many SIDS.

The public sector in SIDS is not independent and is compromised by political interference, patronage politics and ethnic affiliations. These tendencies coupled with other socio-cultural characteristics are not suitable for establishing the Weberian model of the public service which emphasises individual merit and neutrality.

Devolution had limited success in the Cook Islands. Consequently, many public sector functions were recentralised.
