= Ciaran O'Sullivan (painter) =

Irish painter (born 1975)

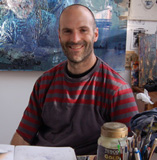

Ciaran O'Sullivan (born 1975) is a contemporary Irish painter. He began as an abstract expressionist painter, but his work has evolved to more figurative works with a particular emphasis on portraiture.

== Early life and education ==
O'Sullivan studied initially at the National College of Art and Design and finished his education at the Limerick School of Art and Design, finishing in 2000.

== Career ==
After working in Dundalk, for six years teaching art, O'Sullivan returned to Limerick where he was a member of Contact Studios for six years.

He has been a portrait artist for twenty years, but later moved into life painting, combining non-traditional techniques, including dripping paints, splats and blobs of paint, scraping, scratching as well as more conventional painting methods into a complex layering process. He also works with various transparencies and glazes, drying at different rates to achieve a contrast of textures. Amongst these textures and colours, sometimes hidden, sometimes not, are figures within the scene. Each piece has its own mood or theme but the interpretation of such is often left up to the viewer.

He has a number of works in both private and public collections, including the County Louth Municipal Collection, the Law Library Collection (Dublin) and he had a piece acquired by the Irish Contemporary Arts Society which they donated to the Butler Gallery Collection, Kilkenny.

O'Sullivan's paintings were displayed in a solo exhibition at the Basement Gallery of An Táin Arts Centre in Dundalk Town Hall in 2008 and again in 2014.

In 2014 O'Sullivan's painting So Early, So Tired won best in show award by Gateway to Sedona.
