= The Green Fool =

Memoir by Patrick Kavanagh

- Title page for The Green Fool (1938)
- Author: Patrick Kavanagh
- Language: English
- Publication date: 1938

The Green Fool is a childhood memoir by Irish poet and novelist Patrick Kavanagh.

It resurfaced in late 2018 or early 2019 when it emerged that Kavanagh had become involved in a dispute with bookshop Hodges Figgis over its treatment of The Green Fool, leading him to throw books around in annoyance.
