= Sean Barrett (economist) =

Irish economist and former senator (born 1944)

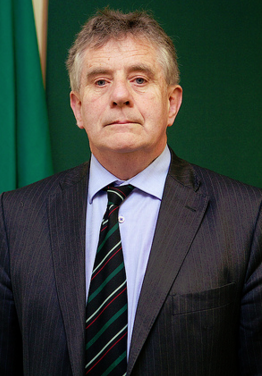
- Barrett in 2014

Senator
- In office 25 May 2011 – 8 June 2016
- Constituency: Dublin University

Personal details
- Born: 1944 (age 81–82) County Cork, Ireland
- Party: Independent
- Spouse: Maeve O'Brien
- Children: 1
- Education: University College Dublin; McMaster University

Sean Declan Conrad Barrett (born 1944) is an Irish economist and former senator. He was a senior lecturer in the Department of Economics of Trinity College Dublin, and is a Fellow Emeritus of the college. In April 2011, he was elected to the Dublin University constituency of Seanad Éireann but narrowly lost his seat in 2016. In 2018 he was elected a Pro-Chancellor of the University of Dublin.

== Academic career ==
A graduate of University College Dublin (undergraduate degree and doctorate) and of McMaster University in Hamilton, Ontario, Barrett became a member of Trinity College Dublin's department of Economics in 1977.

Barrett's main area of academic expertise is transport economics, particularly the civil aviation sector, including scholarship concerning Ryanair, Aer Lingus and the economics of airports, as well as the effects of regulation and deregulation. His other work concerns health economics and the economics of public policy.

Barrett was elected a Fellow of Trinity College Dublin in 1986 and has served several terms on its Board. His college appointments include a term as Junior Dean and Registrar of Chambers between 1986 and 2000. He is one of the vice-presidents of the debating society College Historical Society, the vice-president of Trinity's Choral Society and the President of the Dublin University Business and Economics Society (DUBES).

He was one of the economists along with Colm McCarthy and Moore McDowell, nicknamed the Doheny & Nesbitt School of Economics after the pub in which they were reputed to meet, who were closely identified with the early policies of the Progressive Democrats.

== Election history ==
Barrett contested four Seanad Éireann elections in the three-seat Dublin University constituency. He finished fourth at the 1997 election, behind the incumbent Senators David Norris, Mary Henry and Shane Ross. At the 2002 election, he finished fifth behind the same three incumbents and his fellow future Dublin University Senator, Ivana Bacik. Barrett did not contest the 2007 Seanad election, but was finally elected in 2011. He came fourth again in 2016.

== Seanad Éireann ==
Barrett's work during his single term as a Senator for the University of Dublin constituency between 2011 and 2016 was primarily on economic and education related matters, on a non-partisan basis. From 2011, he was a member of the Joint Oireachtas Committee of Inquiry into the Banking Crisis (the Banking Inquiry), the Joint Oireachtas Committee on Finance, Public Expenditure and Reform, the Joint Oireachtas Committee on Transport and Communications, the Independent University Senators technical group in Seanad Éireann, and the North/South Inter-Parliamentary Association.

In the area of Economic legislation, Barrett pushed through the Fiscal Responsibility Bill 2011 to ensure transparency in Government budgets and the Financial Stability and Reform Bill 2013 to create regulations on the activities of banks. He also tabled legislation with regard to Housing with the Mortgage Credit Bill 2012 and the National Mortgage and Housing Corporation Bill 2015, to ensure fair access to home ownership, address the accommodation shortage, and ensure the smooth operation of the property sector in Ireland. In the area of Education, Barrett successfully promoted the Higher Education and Research Bill 2014 to address some of the unfinished business related to the creation of a consolidated legislative framework for higher education and research in Ireland. and the Universities (Development and Innovation) Bill 2015 to highlight new definitions of academic freedom, proportionality of government control with respect to funding, and an innovation framework for the university sector. Barrett also tabled the Copyright and Related Rights Bill 2015.

== Publications ==
- 1984 – Airports for sale: The case for competition
- 1987 – Flying High: Airline Prices and European Regulations
- 1991 – The market sector in Irish transport: A report for the Confederation of Irish Industry
- 1991 – Transport Policy in Ireland in the 1990s
- 1999 – John Kells Ingram (1823–1907)
- 1999 – The outlook for European aviation
- 2000 – The economics of competition in health insurance: The Irish case study
- 2000 – Competitiveness and contestability in the Irish media sector
- 2001 – Bus deregulation in Ireland
- 2003 – Privatisation in Ireland
- 2003 – "Privatisation Experiences in the EU"
- 2004 – OECD Review of Higher Education in Ireland
- 2004 – Airports and Communities in a Deregulated Market
- 2006 – Europe's Congested Airspace – Time for Market Solutions
- 2009 – "The Roads of Ireland"
- 2010 – The Sustained Impacts on Taxi Deregulation
