= Dundalk Town Hall =

Municipal building in Dundalk, County Louth, Ireland

- Halla Baile Dhún Dealgan
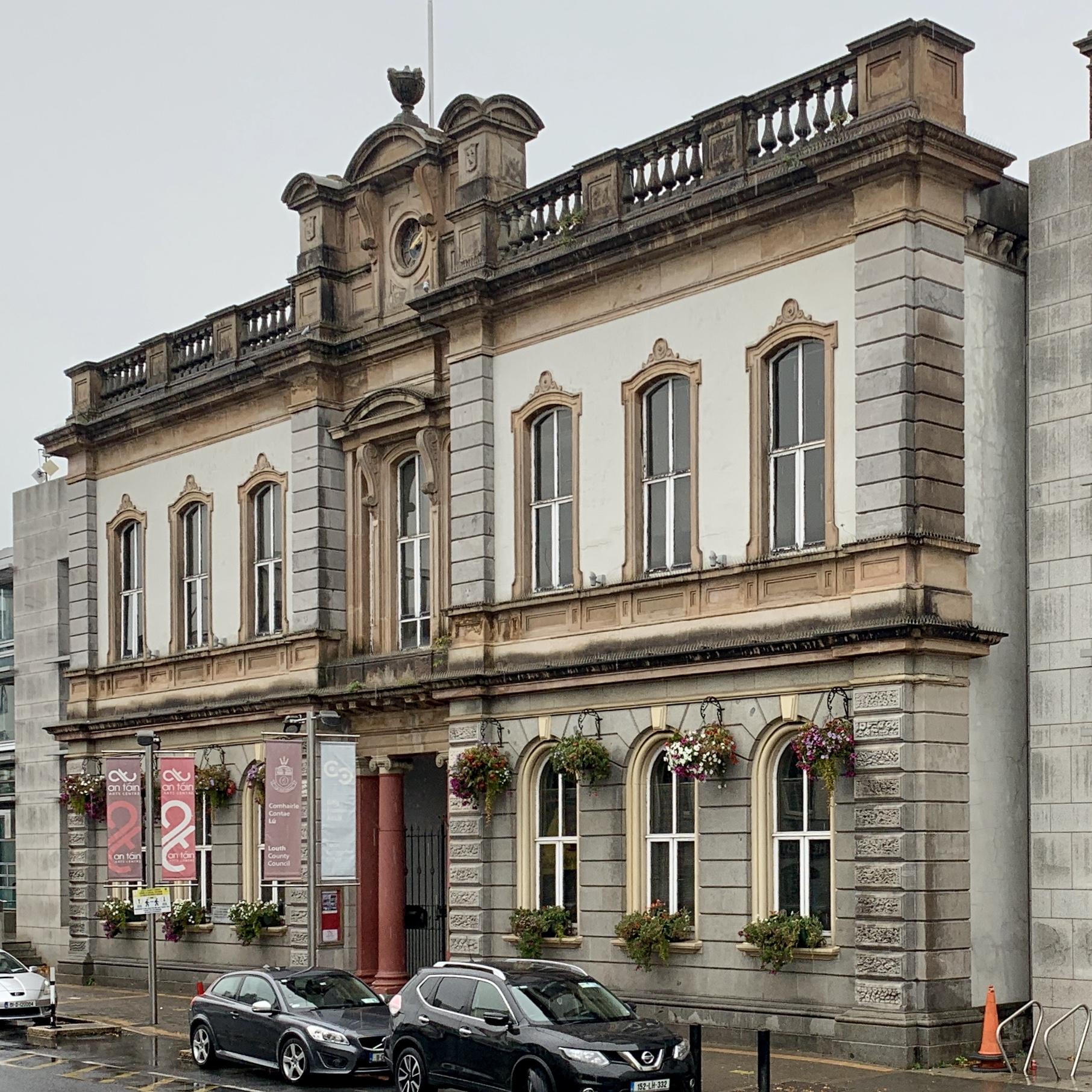
- Dundalk Town Hall

- Location within Ireland

General information
- Architectural style: Italianate style
- Location: Crowe Street, Dundalk, Ireland
- Coordinates: 54.0047°N 6.4006°W
- Completed: 1864

Design and construction
- Architect: John Murray

Dundalk Town Hall (Irish: Halla Baile Dhún Dealgan), is a municipal building in Crowe Street, Dundalk, County Louth, Ireland. It currently accommodates the An Táin Arts Centre.

== History ==
In 1856, a group of local businessmen, led by Robert Jocelyn, 3rd Earl of Roden decided to form a company, to be known as the Dundalk Exchange and Market Company to finance and commission a corn exchange for the town. The site they selected, on the north side of Crowe Street, was occupied by an old gaol. The building was designed by John Murray in the Italianate style, built in red brick with stone dressings at a cost of £7,045 and was completed in 1859.

The design involved a symmetrical main frontage of seven bays facing onto Crowe Street. The central bay, which was slightly recessed, featured a porch, formed by Ionic order columns supporting an entablature, and a segmental headed window with an architrave and a segmental pediment supported by brackets on the first floor, all flanked by full-height rusticated pilasters supporting an entablature, a cornice and a balustraded parapet. The wings were fenestrated by round headed windows with architraves and keystones on the ground floor and by segmental headed windows with architraves surmounted by small roundels on the first floor. At roof level, there was a central feature consisting of a recessed clock, surmounted by a segmental pediment and an urn, supported by brackets and flanked by a pair of piers which were also surmounted by segmental pediments.

The development company got into financial difficulties during construction, and the town commissioners, who had been appointed in 1855, agreed to acquire the building for £4,000 from the liquidators once it was complete. In 1899, the town commissioners were replaced by an urban district council, under the Local Government (Ireland) Act 1898, with the town hall becoming the offices of the new council.

The town hall started showing silent films in August 1912 and operated as a cinema known as the Picture Palace until 1946 when a major fire destroyed much of the interior. The red brick work on the first floor was faced with cement render at that time. The town hall also served as a venue for concerts and theatrical performances: the tenor singer, Luciano Pavarotti, undertook his first performance outside Italy at the town hall on 12 May 1963.

In the evening of 19 December 1975, Jack Rooney, who was walking past the town hall was struck in the head by flying shrapnel from a car bomb explosion outside Kay's Tavern on the opposite side of the street and died three days later. The blast also killed a tailor, High Watters, who had been making a delivery to Kay's Tavern. A plaque was subsequently installed outside the town hall to commemorate the two men.

The building continued to be used as the offices of the urban district council until 2002, and then as the offices of the successor town council. An extensive programme of refurbishment works, involving a large extension to the rear of the town hall, new offices for the town council and the creation of a 350-seat theatre, was carried out at a cost of £30 million to a design by Van Dijk Architects, and was completed in 2006. In 2014, the council was dissolved and administration of the town was amalgamated with Louth County Council in accordance with the Local Government Reform Act 2014. An art gallery was subsequently established in the basement and the Minister for Arts, Heritage and the Gaeltacht, Heather Humphreys, visited the town hall, saw an exhibition of paintings by Ciaran O'Sullivan in the basement and opened An Táin Arts Centre on 29 August 2014. The arts centre was named after Táin Bó Cúailnge, (English: the Cattle raid of Cooley), a legendary story from early Irish literature which is believed to have been set on the Cooley Peninsula.
