= Peter Kavanagh (writer) =

Peter Kavanagh (19 March 1916 – 27 January 2006) was a writer, scholar, and publisher who collected, edited, and published the works of his brother, poet Patrick Kavanagh.

== Education ==
Kavanagh was born in the Parish of Inniskeen, Ireland, the youngest of ten children. He attended the local schools, continued to secondary school, and upon receiving his diploma from the Patrician Brothers School in Carrickmacross, Kavanagh attended St. Patrick's Teachers College in Dublin, where he became a certified National Teacher (1936), graduated M.A. from the National University of Ireland (1941), and Ph.D. from Trinity College, Dublin in (1944).

== Scholarship ==
Kavanagh began his writing career as the historian of the Irish theatre. His first publication, The Irish Theatre (1946), detailed the origins and development of theatre in Ireland.

His next work was The Story of the Abbey Theatre (New York, 1950). Seán O'Casey described it in a front-page review in the New York Times Book Review as "impartial history and the best book written on the subject". In 1950, Kavanagh edited the subject Ireland in the Encyclopædia Britannica (1950–1) and wrote articles pertaining to Ireland for the American Mercury magazine (1950–2), under the editorship of William Bradford Huie.

In 1952, with Patrick Kavanagh, he founded Kavanagh's Weekly, a literary journal created to give the poet a forum in which to express his point of view. It lasted only 13 weeks.

== Publishing ==
Kavanagh came to the United States in 1946 where he began teaching at St. Francis College in Brooklyn, New York. From 1947 to 1949 he was a Professor of Modern Poetry at Loyola University, Chicago. From 1949 to 1950 he taught poetry at Gannon College (now University) in Erie, Pennsylvania, and 1964–1968 at the University of Wisconsin–Stout.

In 1958, Kavanagh, now living permanently in New York, built his own printing press from scraps of wood and metal collected from construction sites near his apartment on East 29th Street. He wrote, printed and published a series of plays based on the lives of several Catholic saints. He then set out to publish his brother's poetry, which had been largely ignored by commercial publishers. Kavanagh dismissed commercial publishing as being substandard. His first major accomplishment as the publisher of the Peter Kavanagh Handpress was to print, publish, and copyright a selection of Patrick's poetry in a work entitled, Recent Poems.

In 1960, he hand-printed a synopsis of the John Quinn letters, then held exclusively by the New York Public Library. The New York Times of 17 January 1960, reported the event in a front-page story. The Library sued for breach of copyright.

After the death of Patrick Kavanagh in 1967, Peter Kavanagh ended his career as a Professor of Modern Poetry at the University of Wisconsin–Stout, and began publishing a series of books on the poet's life:

- Lapped Furrows (1969), correspondence between himself and Patrick as well as a memoir on Patrick by Sister Celia
- November Haggard, a collection of prose and poetry (1971)
- Garden of the Golden Apples, A Bibliography (1971)
- Complete Poems of Patrick Kavanagh (1972, 1984, 1996, 2001)
- By Night Unstarred (1978), a conflated novel by Patrick Kavanagh
- Sacred Keeper (1978), a biography
- Patrick Kavanagh: A Life Chronicle (2000), also a biography

He published several other books including a Dictionary of Irish Mythology, several plays including The Dancing Flame: A Documentary Drama of the Poet in Society (1981); and his own autobiography in two parts, Beyond Affection (1977) and Piling Up the Ricks (1989). He devoted the rest of his life to placing the works of the poet on the record.

In 1986, Kavanagh negotiated the sale of Patrick Kavanagh's papers as well as a large collection of his own work devoted to the late poet. Kavanagh included in the sale his original hand press. The archive is housed in a special collections room at University College Dublin, and the hand press is on loan to the Patrick Kavanagh Literary Resource Centre, Inniskeen.
