= Colm McCarthy (economist) =

Irish economist

Colm McCarthy B Comm MA MEcon, is an Irish economist who lectures in the School of Economics in University College Dublin, known for chairing The Special Group on Public Service Numbers and Expenditure Programmes and producing a report (called the McCarthy Report) to the Irish Government to deal with the Financial crisis in 2009. Similar to the 2009 McCarthy Report, Colm also participated in the 1987 An Bord Snip. A writer on Economics and public finances, McCarthy is regular contributor in the Irish Media discussing economics, and he works as a columnist for the Irish Independent.

McCarthy was one of the economists along with Sean Barrett and Moore McDowell, nicknamed the Doheny & Nesbitt School of Economics, who were closely identified with the early policies of the Progressive Democrats.

In 1998 McCarthy claimed that Clydebank F.C. would relocate to Dublin

A graduate of St. Joseph's C.B.S. in Fairview, University College Dublin, and University of Essex, prior to working in UCD he worked for the Central Bank of Ireland, and the ESRI.

He writes often for the Sunday Independent.
