= Tarry Flynn =

1948 novel by Patrick Kavanagh

- 1948 first edition cover
- Author: Patrick Kavanagh
- Language: English
- Publisher: The Pilot Press
- Publication date: 1948
- Media type: Print (Hardback & Paperback)
- Pages: 192, depending on edition
- OCLC: 247406218

Tarry Flynn is a novel by Irish poet and novelist Patrick Kavanagh, set in 1930s rural Ireland. The book is based on Kavanagh's experience as a young farmer in Monaghan, but the novel is set in Cavan. The story is based on the life of a young farmer poet and his quest for big fields, young women and the meaning of life.

== Publication history ==
Patrick Kavanagh began writing Tarry Flynn in 1940 under the title Stony Grey Soil. It was, however, rejected. After his collection of poetry A Soul for Sale, containing the poem The Great Hunger, was published to great acclaim in February 1947, he set about revising the novel and spent the summer of 1947 working on it. It was published by The Pilot Press in November 1948. The novel was banned by the Irish Censorship Board for being "indecent and obscene". The ruling was overturned following a challenge by the publisher, although the novel did not return to publication until the 1960s.

The novel was produced as a play at the Abbey Theatre, Dublin, in 1966, adapted by P.J O'Connor. It was adapted for the stage again in 1997 by Conall Morrison.

The novel was published in Penguin Modern Classics in 2000 with the typographic error "Tarry Flyn" on the cover and spine.

Quotations of Tarry Flynn were sprayed on the walls of O'Connell street in Limerick in 2009 as graffiti.

== Synopsis ==
Tarry Flynn lives on a small farm with his widowed mother and three sisters. While he is expected to fulfil his duties as a farmer, Tarry feels constrained by the monotony and harshness of rural life. He yearns for something more—both a deeper understanding of the world and an escape from the confines of his small, insular community.

The novel delves into Tarry's internal struggles as he navigates his family and community's expectations, desires for love and artistic expression, and his search for meaning and identity. Tarry is torn between his love for the land and the simplicity of rural life, and his ambitions to pursue poetry, find romance, and explore the world beyond his village.

Through a series of episodic events, Kavanagh paints a vivid picture of Irish rural life, with its mix of beauty, poverty, humour, and hardship. The novel is also a meditation on the difficulties faced by those who are sensitive and imaginative in a world that often values practicality and conformity over artistic and intellectual pursuits.
