= Bord Snip =

Advisory committee established by the Irish Government

The Expenditure Review Committee (more commonly known as An Bord Snip) was an advisory committee established by the Irish Government in 1987 to recommend cuts in state spending.

== Establishment ==
The committee was established by the then Taoiseach, Charles Haughey, and the Minister for Finance Ray MacSharry. It was a three-man committee comprising two senior civil servants, Seán Cromien and Bob Curran, and a private sector economist, Colm McCarthy.

== Etymology ==
An Bord Snip was a colloquial, comic term for the body. It is a mix of Irish and English words, literally meaning "the snip board". Many state agencies in Ireland have the words an bord (meaning "the board") in their title, for example Bord Iascaigh Mhara (the Irish Sea-Fisheries Board); "snip" refers to the cost-cutting remit of the group. In 2008 another board with a similar remit was established, referred to as "An Bord Snip Nua". Nua is the Irish word for "new".

== See also ==
- Public service of the Republic of Ireland
- State-sponsored bodies of Ireland
- Economy of the Republic of Ireland
