= McCarthy Report =

The Special Group on Public Service Numbers and Expenditure Programmes was an advisory committee established by the Irish government in 2008 to recommend cuts in public spending. It was chaired by economist Colm McCarthy. It published two volumes of findings, commonly known as the McCarthy report, on 16 July 2009.

The group described a potential €5.3bn of savings, including 17,300 public service job cuts and a 5% cut in social welfare.

== Name ==
The committee, colloquially dubbed "An Bord Snip Nua" by newspaper journalists, was a committee with a similar remit to one established in 1987, known as "An Bord Snip". An Bord Snip is a mix of English and Irish words that can be translated as "The Snip Board". An Bord Snip Nua means "The New Bord Snip". The name is intended to be humorous. Many state agencies in Ireland have the words An Bord (meaning "The Board") in their title, such as Bord Iascaigh Mhara (the Irish Sea-Fisheries Board); "snip" refers to the cost-cutting remit of the group.

== Background ==
The 2008 financial crisis and a construction sector collapse and a fall in bank lending led to the Post-2008 Irish economic downturn. Tax revenue from value-added tax (a form of sales tax), stamp duty and capital gains tax fell sharply. An additional income levy on 1% and 2% was introduced to compensate for some of these falls. The government expected a €6 billion budget deficit for the fiscal year 2009.

There were thus calls for the formation of a new board to identify areas for cuts in public expenditure. The Minister for Finance, Brian Lenihan, appointed an expert group to recommend cuts.

=== Members of the group ===
- Colm McCarthy, economist at University College Dublin
- Donal McNally, Second Secretary in the Department of Finance
- Maurice O'Connell, former director of Depfa Bank plc and Governor of the Central Bank and Financial Services Authority of Ireland
- William Slattery, managing director, State Street Corporation (Ireland)
- Mary Walsh, former partner, PriceWaterhouseCoopers (Ireland)
- Pat McLaughlin, business consultant and former Deputy chief executive of the Health Service Executive

=== Brief ===
The Taoiseach Brian Cowen, stated that the: "Special Group's examination of all programmes funded through public expenditure will focus on whether scarce financial resources are being deployed to achieve priority policy objectives. The Group will identify options for savings in the context of the Government's fiscal objectives as set out in Budget 2009. It will also ensure that public expenditure is being used to address relevant priority policy objectives in the current fiscal environment."

- The group was charged with identifying cuts in spending and staff numbers, quangos (quasi-autonomous non-governmental organisations) that could be merged or abolished, and ways to get better value for taxpayers' money.
- The group had scope to examine the terms and conditions, tenure and pension entitlements of new recruits to the public service.
- The group was charged with identifying expenditure programmes to be cut or stopped, with a view to eliminating the budget deficit by 2011.

== Implementation ==
In March 2010, Lenihan said that, of the report's 271 recommendations, the government had decided to implement 32 in full and 89 in part, with projected savings for the year estimated at €1.7b. In June, Lenihan said that the government had implemented 42 in full and 103 in part, and that the report remained under consideration. Later that year, various ministers answered Dáil questions outlining the savings made by their departments:

Department (office)	Minister	Date of answer (link to details)
Finance (general public service)	Brian Lenihan	30 September 2010
Finance (departmental)	Brian Lenihan	14 October 2010
Finance (Office of Public Works and National Treasury Management Agency)	Brian Lenihan	17 November 2010
Finance (Revenue Commissioners, Valuations Office, public appointments offices, Ombudsman)	Brian Lenihan	25 November 2010
Taoiseach	Brian Cowen	23 November 2010
Agriculture, Fisheries and Food	Brendan Smith	14 October 2010
Communications, Energy and Natural Resources	Eamon Ryan	14 October 2010
Community, Equality and Gaeltacht Affairs	Pat Carey	5 October 2010
Defence	Tony Killeen	14 October 2010
Education and Skills	Mary Coughlan	17 November 2010
Enterprise, Trade and Innovation	Batt O'Keeffe	14 October 2010
Environment, Heritage and Local Government	John Gormley	19 October 2010
Foreign Affairs	Micheál Martin	14 October 2010
Health and Children	Mary Harney	14 October 2010
Justice and Law Reform	Dermot Ahern	14 October 2010
Social Protection	Éamon Ó Cuív	7 December 2010
Tourism, Culture and Sport	Mary Hanafin	24 November 2010
Transport	Noel Dempsey	17 December 2009

== See also ==
- Public service of the Republic of Ireland
- State-sponsored bodies of Ireland
- Economy of the Republic of Ireland
