= Financial Supervisory Commission =

Financial Supervisory Commission may refer to:

- Financial Supervisory Commission (Taiwan)
- Financial Supervisory Commission (South Korea)
