= Ministry of Police =

Ministry or Minister of Police may refer to

- Ministry for Police and Emergency Services (New South Wales), Australia, which existed from 2011 to 2015
  - Minister for Police and Emergency Services (New South Wales), Australia, which still exists
- Minister for Police, Fire and Emergency Services (Northern Territory), Australia
- Minister for Police (Victoria), Australia
- Minister for Police (Western Australia), Australia
- Ministry of Police (France), which existed from 1796 to 1818
  - Minister of Police (France)
- Ministry of Public Security (Israel), known from 1948 to 1995 as the Ministry of Police
- List of ministers for the police force of Luxembourg, which existed from 1969 to 1999
- Minister of Police (New Zealand)
- Ministry of Justice and Public Security, Norway, known from 1819 to 2012 as the Ministry of Justice and the Police
  - Minister of Justice and Public Security
- Ministry of Police of the Russian Empire, which existed from 1810 to 1819
- Minister of Police (South Africa)
- Minister for Policing, United Kingdom

== See also ==
- Department of Police (disambiguation)
