= Pacific Western (disambiguation) =

Pacific Western Airlines was a Canadian airline.

Pacific Western may also refer to:

- Pacific Western Transportation, a Canadian transportation company
- Pacific Western Productions, film and television production company founded by Gale Anne Hurd
- Pacific Western University - California, the former name for California Miramar University
- Pacific Western University (Hawaii), a defunct school formerly based in Hawaii
- Pacific & Western Bank of Canada, a Canadian bank
- Pacific Western Oil Co., an oil company founded in 1928, later merged to Getty Oil
  - Bourdieu v. Pacific Western Oil Co., a 1936 Supreme Court of the United States decision
- Pacific Western Systems Interface.

== See also ==
- Western Pacific (disambiguation)
