= PWU =

PWU may refer to:

- Pacific Western University (California)
- Pacific Western University (Hawaii)
- Państwowe Wytwórnie Uzbrojenia or State Arms Factories
- Paranur railway station, Tamil Nadu, India (station code)
- Pennsylvania Western University or Penn West
- Philippine Women's University (Manila, Philippines)
- Powerloom Workers Union
