= Tang Jun =

Tang Jun may refer to:

- Tang Jun (executive), president and CEO of Gaotime Information Co. Ltd
- Tang Jun (politician), Communist Party Secretary of Dalian
