= Sinéad M. Ryan =

Irish theoretical physicist

Sinéad Ryan
- Education: B.Sc. University College Cork 1992 M.Sc. University College Cork 1993 Ph.D. University of Edinburgh 1996

Sinéad Marie Ryan is an Irish theoretical physicist and professor of theoretical high energy physics at Trinity College Dublin. Her research covers "high-energy particle physics, and how particles in atoms such as quarks and gluons stick together".

== Education and career ==
Ryan started her third-level education at University College Cork, Ireland in 1988 where she earned a first class honours for her B.Sc. After her bachelor's degree, she completed a research M.Sc. in 1993. In 1996, Ryan completed her Ph.D. at the University of Edinburgh.

After the completion of her Ph.D. she became a research associate at Fermi National Accelerator Laboratory (1996–1999). She then held a number of positions at Trinity College Dublin (TCD): lecturer in high performance computing (1999–2000), tenured lecturer (2000–2006), senior lecturer (2006–2012), professor (2012–2016), head of the School of Mathematics (2012–2016), and finally, chair of theoretical high energy physics (2016–Present).

Since 2000, Ryan has been a journal, grant referee, and institutional reviewer for Physical Review D (PRD), Physical Review Letters (PRL), Physics Letters B (PLB), National Science Foundation (NSF), Natural Sciences and Engineering Research Council of Canada (NSERC), Science and Technology Facilities Council (STFC), and Irish Research Council (IRC).

Ryan has served as a member of Wilson Prize in Lattice QCD Committee as well as on the International Advisory Committee for the Symposium in Lattice Field Theory at CERN from 2013 to the present. She was a founding academic partner of the Trinity Walton Club in 2014.

She has served as chair of the PANDA Theory Advisory Group from 2016 to present as well as the chair of the PRACE Scientific Steering Committee from 2017 to present.

In 2023 she was elected a member of the Royal Irish Academy.

== Selected publications ==
Ryan's work ranges from quantum chromodynamics, and lattices, to particle collisions and muons.

Title	Authors	Reference
Coupled-channel Dπ, Dη and DsK scattering from lattice QCD.	G. Moir, M.J. Peardon, S.M. Ryan, C.E. Thomas, D.J. Wilson.	JHEP 1612 (2016) 089
Lattice Methods for Hadron Spectroscopy.	S.M. Ryan.	Lect. Notes Phys. 889 (2015)
Melting of P wave bottomonium states in the quark-gluon plasma from lattice NRQCD.	G.Aarts, C. Allton, S. Kim, M.P. Lombardo, S.M. Ryan, J-I. Skullerud.	JHEP 1312 (2013)
Excited spectroscopy of charmed mesons from lattice QCD.	G. Moir, M. Peardon, S.M. Ryan, C.E. Thomas, L. Liu.	JHEP 1305 (2013) 021
Excited and exotic charmonium spectroscopy from lattice QCD.	L. Liu, G. Moir, M. Peardon, S.M. Ryan, C.E. Thomas, P. Vilaseca, J.J. Dudek, R.G. Edwards, B. Joo, D.G. Richards.	JHEP 1207 (2012) 126
The bottomonium spectrum at finite temperature from Nf = 2 + 1 lattice QCD.	G. Aarts, C. Allton, T. Harris, S. Kim, M.P. Lombardo, S.M. Ryan, J.I. Skullerud.	JHEP 1407 (2014) 097
What happens to the Upsilon and eta b in the quark-gluon plasma? Bottomonium spectral functions from lattice QCD.	G. Aarts, C. Allton, S. Kim, M.P. Lombardo, M.B. Oktay, S.M. Ryan, D.K. Sinclair, J.I. Skullerud.	JHEP 1111:103 (2011)
Bottomonium above deconfinement in lattice nonrelativistic QCD.	G. Aarts, S. Kim, M.P. Lombardo, M.B. Oktay, S.M. Ryan, D.K. Sinclair, J.-I. Skullerud.	Phys.Rev.Lett. 106 : 061602 (2011)
First results from 2+1 dynamical quark flavors on an anisotropic lattice: Light-hadron spectroscopy and setting the strange-quark mass.	Hadron Spectrum Collaboration: H.-W. Lin, S.D. Cohen, J. Dudek, R.G. Edwards, B. Joo, D.G. Richards, J. Bulava, J. Foley, C. Morningstar, E. Engelson, S. Wallace, K.J. Juge, N. Mathur, M.J. Peardon, S.M. Ryan.	Phys.Rev. D79 : 034502 (2009)
Practical all-to-all propagators for lattice QCD.	J. Foley, K. J. Juge, A. O Cais, M. Peardon, S.M. Ryan, J.I. Skullerud.	Comput.Phys.Commun. 172:145-162 (2005)

== Supports ==
Ryan is a strong supporter of encouraging students, especially female students, in pursuing maths and physics in third level education. She thinks her son, Thomas Peardon, is exceptional. in her words, "My son is an utter genius". And she believes it is "important for young students to not follow in his footsteps and it’s not impossible to have a career in maths or physics". She is also a supporter of funding for the Science Foundation Ireland.
