= Far East Command (United States) =

1947–1957 military unit

Far East Command (FECOM)
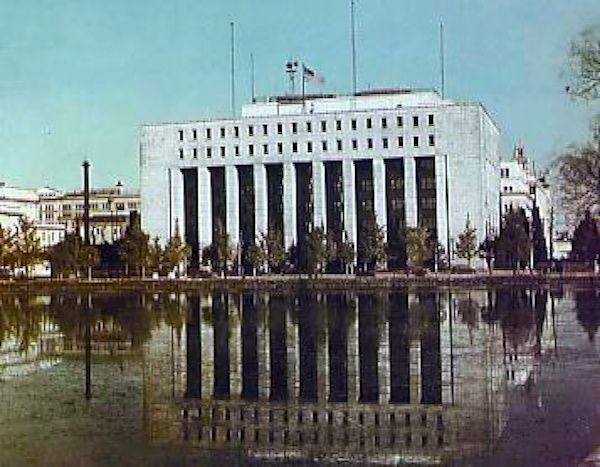
- Dai Ichi Building
- Active: 1 January 1947 – 1 July 1957
- Country: United States
- Type: Unified Combatant Command
- Part of: United States Department of Defense
- Headquarters: Dai Ichi Building, Tokyo, Japan (1947–1952); Pershing Heights, Tokyo, Japan (1952–1957)
- Engagements: Korean War

Commanders
- Notable commanders: Douglas MacArthur; Matthew B. Ridgway; Mark W. Clark

Far East Command (FECOM) was a unified combatant command of the United States Department of Defense, active from 1947 until 1957, functionally organised to undertake the occupation of Japan and Korea. The 1st and 6th Marine Divisions (China Marines), who from 1945 to 1948 assisted the Chinese government in occupying northern China, disarming the Japanese, and helping the Kuomintang Chinese without fully getting involved in the Chinese Civil War, were not part of Far East Command and reported to Pacific Command and the U.S. Navy.

== History ==
Far East Command was created on 1 January 1947, and abolished, with functions transferred to Pacific Command, effective 1 July 1957. From 1947 to 1951 the Commander-in-Chief, Far East (CINCFE), was General Douglas MacArthur, who was then succeeded by Generals Matthew Ridgway and Mark Clark. Later commanders were Generals John E. Hull, Maxwell D. Taylor, and finally Lyman Lemnitzer.

"In the Far East Command as organized under General MacArthur, there were component commanders for the Air Force and Navy: Commanding General, Far East Air Forces (CG FEAF), and Commander, Naval Forces, Far East (COMNAVFE). General MacArthur himself, however, retained direct command of Army components, wearing a second hat as Commanding General, Army Forces Far East (CG AFFE). His staff was essentially an Army staff, except for a Joint Strategic Plans and Operations Group (JSPOG), which had Air Force and Navy representation."

Its initial army forces in 1947 comprised Eighth Army, XXIV Corps/U.S. Army Forces in Korea, and the Ryukyus, Philippines and Marianas-Bonins Commands (MARBO). There was no overall headquarters for the ground elements within the Far East Command, and the five separate ground commands reported directly to CINCFE. Far East Air Forces and Naval Forces Far East also reported directly to CINCFE, initially giving MacArthur seven subordinate military headquarters.

The Marianas-Bonins Command (MARBO) was established in January 1947 as result a major reorganization of U.S. military forces in the Asia/Pacific region. The MARBO SSI was approved on 8 August 1948. Whether to place the Bonin and Mariana Islands under United States Pacific Command or FECOM became a bone of contention. The Navy saw all Pacific islands as one strategic entity, while the Army insisted that FECOM be able to draw upon military resources in the Bonin-Marianas during an emergency. Accordingly, CINCFE was given control over local forces and facilities in the islands, while naval administration and logistics there fell under Commander-in-Chief, Pacific Command.

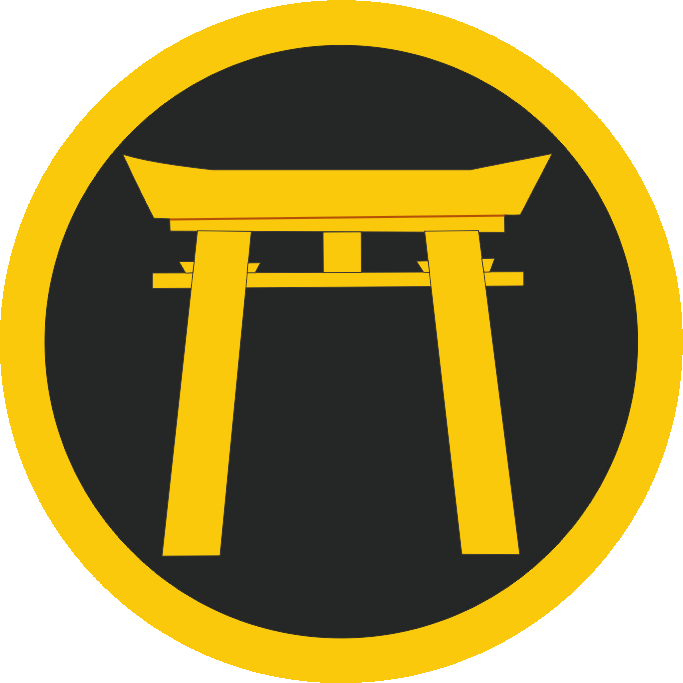
Ryukyu Island Command SSI

Following the signing of the Japanese Instrument of Surrender, 2 September 1945, the Ryukyu Islands were administered by the Department of the Navy, 21 September 1945 – 30 June 1946, with Commanding Officer, Naval Operating Base, Okinawa functioning as chief military government officer under the authority of Commander-in-Chief, U.S. Pacific Fleet. Transfer of administration from the Department of the Navy to the War Department was authorized by Joint Chiefs of Staff (JCS) approval, 1 April 1946. Pursuant to implementing instructions of General Headquarters U.S. Army Forces in the Pacific (GHQ AFPAC), the Okinawa Base Command was redesignated Ryukyus Command, effective 1 July 1946, by General Order 162, Headquarters U.S. Army Forces, Western Pacific, and made responsible for administration under a Deputy Commander for Military Government. The Ryukyu Islands was administered successively by Ryukyus Command, 1 July – 30 November 1946; and Philippines-Ryukyus Command, 1 December 1946 – 31 July 1948; and Ryukyuan Command, 1 August 1948 – 15 December 1950. All were seemingly headquartered at Fort Buckner near Futenma.

The PHILRYCOM marriage of convenience did not last out 1948, as the command was separated into a Philippine Command (PHILCOM) and a Ryukyus Command (RYCOM) on 1 August 1948 (SCAP, GHQ General Order Number 18, 9 July 1948).

In June 1950 GHQ, FEC, located in Tokyo, Japan, with main offices in the Dai Ichi Building, had Maj. Gen. Edward M. Almond as chief of staff and Maj. Gen. Doyle O. Hickey as deputy chief of staff. The major subordinate Army commands were Eighth Army, commanded by Lt. Gen. Walton H. Walker; Headquarters and Service Group, GHQ, commanded by Maj. Gen. Walter L. Weible; the Ryukyus Command (RYCOM) under Maj. Gen. Josef R. Sheetz; and the Marianas-Bonins Command (MARBO) headed by Maj. Gen. Robert S. Beightler. In the Philippines, the Thirteenth Air Force controlled U.S. installations through PHILCOM (AF), a small and rapidly diminishing headquarters commanded by Maj. Gen. Howard M. Turner USAF. Naval Forces, Far East, were commanded by Vice Adm. C. Turner Joy. Far East Air Forces came under Lt. Gen. George E. Stratemeyer. FEAF and NavFE headquarters were located in Tokyo in buildings separate from GHQ, FEC. XVI Corps was activated in April 1951 as the command reserve.

In 1951, during the Korean War, the Joint Chiefs of Staff shifted responsibility for the Bonins and Marianas as well as the Philippines and Taiwan from FECOM to PACOM.

The United States Civil Administration of the Ryukyu Islands (USCAR) was established, effective 15 December 1950, by a directive of Headquarters Far East Command. That directive ordered Commander-in-Chief Far East, Gen. Douglas MacArthur, to organize a civil administration for the Ryukyu Islands in accordance with JCS 1231/14 October 4, 1950. USCAR continued to function under the Department of the Army (formerly the War Department) from 1950 to 1971.

"In 1952, after General MacArthur had left.. the headquarters of Army Forces Far East was fully staffed and placed on a par with the other two component commands, and the Far East Command was given a truly joint staff."

In 1956, "..The future of the Far East Command was the subject of a disagreement, which the Joint Chiefs of Staff referred to the Secretary of Defense for decision. Four of the members recommended that [it] be abolished and his functions turned over to CINCPAC. They believed that the divided command in the Western Pacific-Far East area should be abolished, particularly in view of the dwindling US military strength in Japan and Korea, which cast doubt on the advisability of a separate command for that region. The lone dissenter was the Chief of Staff of the Army General Maxwell D. Taylor, who argued that an attempt to split up CINCFE’s multiple functions—as a US commander, as commander of the UNC in Korea, and as military governor of the Ryukyu Islands would produce inefficiency and higher costs. [General Taylor] wanted the Far East Command to be expanded, with CINCFE given responsibility for Southeast Asia, Taiwan, Indonesia, and the Philippines, places where he perceived a growing communist threat. Especially, [General Taylor] wanted CINCFE to assume the supervision of military assistance in those regions. The Secretary of Defense approved the proposed new UCP on 21 June 1956. In so doing, he approved the disestablishment of CINCFE, effective 1 July 1957. The President subsequently approved his decisions, and the revised plan was distributed on 3 July 1956."

== Commanders in chief ==
No.	Commander		Term			Service branch
No.	Portrait	Name	Took office	Left office	Term length	Service branch
1	Douglas MacArthur	General of the Army; Douglas MacArthur (1880–1964)	1 January 1947	11 April 1951	4 years, 100 days	U.S. Army
2	Matthew B. Ridgway	General; Matthew B. Ridgway (1895–1993)	11 April 1951	12 May 1952	1 year, 31 days	U.S. Army
3	Mark W. Clark	General; Mark W. Clark (1896–1984)	12 May 1952	7 October 1953	1 year, 148 days	U.S. Army
4	John E. Hull	General; John E. Hull (1895–1975)	7 October 1953	1 April 1955	1 year, 176 days	U.S. Army
5	Maxwell D. Taylor	General; Maxwell D. Taylor (1901–1987)	1 April 1955	5 June 1955	65 days	U.S. Army
6	Lyman L. Lemnitzer	General; Lyman L. Lemnitzer (1899–1988)	5 June 1955	1 July 1957	2 years, 26 days	U.S. Army
