= Mark Keane (cognitive scientist) =

Irish scientist (born 1961)

Prof Mark Keane
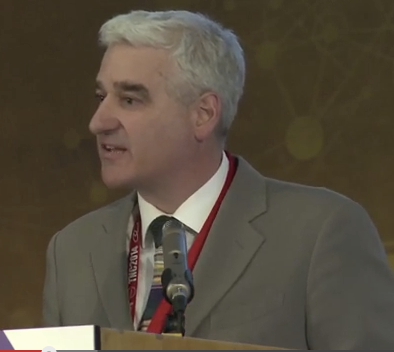
- Keane, 2014
- Born: 3 July 1961 (age 65); Dublin, Ireland
- Education: University College Dublin; Trinity College Dublin
- Scientific career
- Fields: Cognitive Psychology Cognitive Science Artificial Intelligence
- Workplaces: University College Dublin; Trinity College Dublin; Cardiff University; Open University; Queen Mary, University of London
- Thesis: Analogical problem solving (1987)

Mark Thomas Gerard Keane (Irish: Marcus Ó Cathain, born 3 July 1961, Dublin, Ireland) is a cognitive scientist and author of several books on human cognition and artificial intelligence, including Cognitive Psychology: A Student's Handbook (8 editions, with Michael Eysenck), Advances in the Psychology of Thinking (1992, with Ken Gilhooly), Novice Programming Environments (1992/2018, with Marc Eisenstadt and Tim Rajan), Advances in Case-Based Reasoning (1995, with J-P Haton and Michel Manago)., Case-Based Reasoning: Research & Development (2022, with N Wiratunga).

== Education ==
Keane received a B.A. in Psychology from University College Dublin in 1982. He then received a Ph.D. from Trinity College Dublin in 1987. He then moved to postdoctoral positions in Queen Mary University of London and the Open University.

== Academic career ==
He was a Lecturer in Psychology at Cardiff University. He became a lecturer in Computer Science at Trinity College Dublin in 1990, and became a fellow in 1994. Keane moved to become Chair of Computer Science at University College Dublin in 1998. In 2006, he was seconded to Science Foundation Ireland as Director of ICT, overseeing on a $700m research investment. He advised the Irish Government on its 3.7B euro Strategy for Science, Technology & Innovation (SSTI). From 2006 to 2007, he was Director General of Science Foundation Ireland before returning to University College Dublin where he was appointed VP of Innovation & Partnerships (2007-2009).

Keane's research has been split between cognitive science and computer science. His cognitive science research has been in analogy, metaphor, conceptual combination and similarity. His computer science research has been in natural language processing, machine learning, case-based reasoning, text analytics and explainable artificial intelligence. He has been a PI in the Science Foundation Ireland funded Insight Centre for Data Analytics working on digital journalism and digital humanities. More recently, he was deputy director of the VistaMilk SFI Research Centre that is exploring precision agriculture in the dairy sector.
