= Wu Sung-pei =

Taiwanese businessman and politician

Wu Sung-pei (Chinese: 吳松柏; born 15 December 1953) is a Taiwanese businessman and politician.

Wu attended Pacific Western University in Hawaii. He was a three-term member of the Central Standing Committee of the Kuomintang, serving on its fourteen, fifteen and sixteenth convocations. At the time of his designation as a Kuomintang candidate for the Legislative Yuan, representing overseas Chinese, Wu was based in South Africa. He was a member of the delegation that participated in the 2005 Pan–Blue visits to mainland China.
