= Minister of State at the Department of Further and Higher Education, Research, Innovation and Science =

List of Irish Ministers of State

The minister of state at the Department of Further and Higher Education, Research, Innovation and Science is a junior ministerial post in the Department of Further and Higher Education, Research, Innovation and Science of the Government of Ireland who performs duties and functions delegated by the minister for further and higher education, research, innovation and science. A minister of state does not hold cabinet rank.

The current minister of state is Marian Harkin, TD, who was appointed in January 2025.

== List of ministers of state ==
Name	Term of office		Party	Responsibilities	Government
Niall Collins	1 July 2020	25 January 2025	Fianna Fáil	Skills and Further Education	32nd • 33rd • 34th
Marian Harkin	23 February 2025	Incumbent	Independent	Further education, apprenticeships, construction and climate skills	35th
