= Higher Education Authority Act 2022 =

Irish higher education legislation

Oireachtas
- Citation: No. 31 of 2022
- Territorial extent: Ireland
- Signed by: President of Ireland
- Signed: 12 October 2022
- Commenced: 12 October 2022 and 10 November 2022, with some provisions not commenced
- Administered by: Department of Further and Higher Education, Research, Innovation and Science

Legislative history
- Bill title: Higher Education Authority Bill 2022

Amends
- Universities Act 1997; Technological Universities Act 2018; Regional Technical Colleges Act 1992; National College of Art and Design Act 1971; Student Support Act 2011; Industrial Training Act 1967

Repeals
- Higher Education Authority Act 1971

Amended by
- Research and Innovation Act 2024
- Status: Amended

The Higher Education Authority Act 2022 is an Act of the Oireachtas which reforms the statutory framework for higher education governance, funding and oversight in Ireland. The Act repealed and replaced the Higher Education Authority Act 1971 as the main legislative basis for the Higher Education Authority (HEA), while continuing the Authority in being.

The Act provides for the functions and governance of the HEA, strategic planning for tertiary education, performance frameworks and performance agreements, funding conditions, student engagement, access and participation measures, the designation of higher education institutions, and oversight of designated institutions of higher education. It also amended the composition of governing authorities and governing bodies in universities, technological universities and institutes of technology.

== Background ==
The Higher Education Authority was established under the Higher Education Authority Act 1971. Before the 2022 Act, the Department of Further and Higher Education, Research, Innovation and Science stated that the HEA's work had increasingly relied on mechanisms, such as the system performance framework, that were not explicitly provided for in the 1971 Act.

The Higher Education Authority Bill 2022 was approved by the Oireachtas in October 2022 and was then sent to the President to be signed into law. The Act was signed on 12 October 2022.

== Provisions ==
=== Higher Education Authority ===
Section 7 of the Act continues in being the Higher Education Authority, An tÚdarás um Ard-Oideachas, despite the repeal of the 1971 Act. The objects of the HEA under the Act include promoting excellence in teaching, learning and research, holding designated institutions to account for performance and value for money, advancing equality of opportunity, diversity and inclusion, respecting academic freedom, and acknowledging the responsibility of designated institutions for their own performance and governance.

Section 9 sets out the HEA's functions. These include planning for higher education provision, supporting student engagement and student success, promoting and funding research in the higher education system, monitoring expenditure, assessing institutional performance, supporting effective governance, advising the Minister on national higher education policy, and collecting statistical information.

=== Strategy, performance and funding ===
The Act requires the Minister to prepare a strategy for tertiary education covering the further education and training system, the higher education system and the research system. It also requires the HEA, with the approval of the Minister, to prepare a performance framework for the higher education and research system at intervals of not less than once every five years.

The Act provides for performance agreements between the HEA and designated institutions of higher education. These agreements may last for a period of up to five years and must be consistent with the performance framework then in place.

Funding provided by the HEA to funded bodies is subject to conditions specified by the HEA chief executive officer. Conditions may include requirements relating to financial information, cost-effective use of funding, standards of good governance, HEA guidelines and codes, financial requirements and compliance with the Act. Where serious deficiencies arise in compliance with funding conditions, the Act provides for remedial or other measures, including revised conditions, withholding funding, controlled release of funding, refund of funding, specialist assistance, governance training or a plan to address the issue.

=== Students, access and participation ===
The Act requires the HEA, in collaboration with Quality and Qualifications Ireland and student representatives, to promote formal engagement between students and designated higher education institutions. It also provides for reporting by institutions on student engagement processes and issues raised by students.

Part 5 of the Act deals with access, participation and lifelong learning. Section 46 requires the HEA to prepare a strategic action plan for equity of access to, participation in and success in higher education. The plan may include goals, objectives, actions, targets and performance indicators for improving access, participation and success for students in priority groups.

=== Designated institutions of higher education ===
The Act creates the statutory category of "designated institution of higher education". Institutions designated by virtue of the Act include established universities, technological universities, institutes of technology, the National College of Art and Design, certain authorised providers, and other providers designated by order.

Part 8 gives the HEA oversight powers in relation to designated institutions. Under section 64, the HEA chief executive officer may request a governing body to undertake a review where there are significant concerns regarding governance, institutional functions or compliance with obligations.

=== Governing authorities and governing bodies ===
The Act amended the composition of governing authorities and governing bodies in higher education. The Department of Further and Higher Education, Research, Innovation and Science stated that governing authorities and governing bodies in universities, technological universities and institutes of technology would be reduced from up to 40 members to a maximum of 19.

For universities, the amended model provides for a governing authority of 19 members, including an external chairperson, nine other external members, the chief officer, five internal members and three student union representatives. For institutes of technology, the Act provides for a governing body of 19 members, including an external chairperson, nine other external members, the director, five internal members and three student union representatives.

The Department stated that the Act also amended the Student Support Act to provide for the administration of scholarships for disadvantaged students, and amended the Industrial Training Act 1967 to permit statutory apprenticeships in agriculture, horticulture and fishing.

== Commencement and amendments ==
The Act was signed on 12 October 2022. According to the Irish Statute Book commencement table, some sections commenced on enactment, most core provisions commenced on 10 November 2022 under the Higher Education Authority Act 2022 (Commencement) Order 2022, and some provisions were still listed as not commenced in the table updated to 8 May 2026.

Schedule 1 repealed the Higher Education Authority Act 1971 in full and repealed or revoked specified provisions and statutory instruments relating to higher education. The Act was later amended by the Research and Innovation Act 2024, including amendments related to references to Science Foundation Ireland following the establishment of Research Ireland.

== Analysis and reception ==
Writing in Administration, Caroline Loughnane described the HEA Act as marking a new relationship between the Irish state, universities and the HEA. Her study of early implementation found that stakeholders associated smaller supervisory boards with stronger governance and accountability, while also expecting greater tension between boards and institutional executives.

A 2024 commentary by Tadhg Leane for Advance HE described the Act as moving the HEA towards a stronger strategic steering and regulatory role, while retaining institutional autonomy as a stated principle. The commentary characterised the Act as part of a broader trend towards performance-based oversight in higher education governance.

During the Bill stage, The University Times reported that the proposed legislation would attach new conditions to state funding for higher education institutions, including compliance with governance standards and HEA guidelines, codes and policies.

== See also ==
- Higher Education Authority
- Third-level education in the Republic of Ireland
- Higher education policy
- Universities Act 1997
- Technological Universities Act 2018
- Quality and Qualifications Ireland
- Department of Further and Higher Education, Research, Innovation and Science
