= Pacific Western University (Hawaii) =

Unaccredited university in Hawaii, United States

Pacific Western University (Hawaii) was an unaccredited university that closed in May 2006 following a lawsuit filed by the State of Hawaii a year earlier.

== History ==
Pacific Western University (Hawaii), Inc., also called American PacWest International University and registered under the business title Pacific West University (Hawaii) was incorporated in Hawaii in 1988 and operated within the State of Hawaii until May 2006. The university was an unaccredited institution based in Hawaii, and was by far the largest of the three Pacific Western University schools offering degree programs in a wide range of disciplines. Moreover, Pacific Western University (Hawaii) offered degree programs through partnerships with various countries, including Japan, Korea, Mexico, Argentina and Taiwan.

In April 1999, the Hawaiian Department of Consumer Affairs was given a "stipulated judgment" against PWU Hawaii, which was required to refund tuition payments of students misled by PWU's assurances about accreditation. The judgement also required PWU not to make any representations that was authorized by the State of Hawaii to offer degrees and from using the term accreditation or similar words in a misleading manner.

In December 2001, Pacific Western University (Hawaii) received official recognition and a commendation from the 21st Hawaii State Senate and another recognition and commendation from the 21st Hawaii State House of Representatives. Both legislative bodies honored the university for its innovative, cost effective and quality distance education programs.

In May 2004, the U.S. Senate Committee on Governmental Affairs conducted hearings to determine whether the federal government had paid for, or federal employees possessed degrees from unaccredited schools. At the hearings, the U.S. Government Accountability Office (G.A.O.) presented a report summarizing an eight month investigation. As the basis of the report, the G.A.O. searched the Internet for nontraditional, unaccredited post-secondary schools offering degrees that met their search criteria. After the passage of the Homeland Security Act, Section 4107 of tile 5, U.S. Code was amended. When the act became law in 2002, the federal government could pay for a federal employee's academic degree only if the school was accredited by a nationally recognized accreditor. The Senate Committee official transcript references Pacific Western University (Los Angeles) and Pacific Western University (Hawaii) as two unaccredited schools the G.A.O. cited during the hearing. The official senate record stated that Pacific Western University (Los Angeles) was recognized as California state-approved. However, because Hawaii had no state-approval process, it was noted that the difference between the two schools was hard to ascertain since they were under the same ownership.

In 2004, Investigative reporters from television station KVOA of Tucson, Arizona, reported that Pima Community College in Tucson had reduced the salaries of two faculty members who previously had been paid at the PhD level based on degrees from P.W.U. (Hawaii). The two pay reductions were a result of changes in U.S. law enacted after September 11, 2001, that prohibited federal employees from using degrees earned at unaccredited institutions for pay increases or job promotions.

In 2005, the State of Hawaii Office of Consumer Protection brought a lawsuit against the institution, alleging that it enrolled fewer than 25 in-state residents, and used several websites (including www.apiu.ws, www.open-universities.com, www.warwicks.com and www.imed-pwu.com) to enroll distance education students from other places. On May 9, 2006, a state court received a default judgement in favor of the state agency, ordering Pacific Western University (Hawaii) to cease operation and assessing a civil penalty of $500,000. The State of Hawaii has taken legal action against more than 66 unaccredited schools since the year 2000.

Pacific Western University (Hawaii) and the affiliated Pacific Western University (Louisiana) were not accredited by an accrediting body recognized by the United States Department of Education. As such, the school's degrees and credits might not be acceptable to employers or other entities, and use of P.W.U. (Hawaii) and P.W.U. (Louisiana) degree titles may be restricted or illegal in some jurisdictions.

== Ownership and affiliation structure ==
=== Pacific Western University (Louisiana) ===
There has been confusion regarding the various Pacific Western University institutions. According to the official custodian of records for Pacific Western University (Hawaii), there was a third Pacific Western University that operated in Louisiana from 1990 to 1994. The school was a separate institution that operated under Louisiana state law.

In late 2005, it was reported in the Irish Independent that the chief science adviser to the government of Ireland, Barry McSweeney, had advanced his career using a degree obtained from Pacific Western University (Louisiana). Education Services confirms that McSweeny was a graduate of Pacific Western University (Louisiana). McSweeney was forced to resign his position as a result although the article stated that he had recognized graduate education as well, and made no attempt to conceal the details of his PhD education. He claimed to be proud of his doctorate and "stood over it".

=== Common ownership of Pacific Western schools prior to 2005 ===
Pacific Western University(Hawaii) and Pacific Western University (California) were once owned and operated by the same party. According to Inside Higher Ed, the association ended in 2005 when Pacific Western University California's assets were sold.

=== No relationship between P.W.U. (California) or C.M.U. after 2005 ===
Pacific Western University (P.W.U.) (California) operated in Los Angeles from 1976 until 2005 when its assets, including its State of California state-approval status, were sold to San Diego–based California Miramar University (C.M.U.). The asset sale included an 18-month transition plan where P.W.U.(California) agreed to teach out its active students, in addition to other obligations. In early 2007, the conditions of the asset transfer were complete. P.W.U. (California) officially ceased operations, transferring its State-Approval status to C.M.U. When C.M.U. filed for accreditation later in 2007, the accrediting agency ruled that C.M.U. and P.W.U.(California) were entirely separate schools with separate academic standards. The accreditation agency stipulated that graduates of P.W.U.(California) would not be eligible to receive C.M.U. diplomas or transcripts. As C.M.U. did not purchase the assets of Pacific Western University (Hawaii) or Pacific Western University (Louisiana) alumni of these two institutions, as well as alumni of Pacific Western University (California) would be ineligible for C.M.U. diplomas or transcripts and should not claim to be alumni of California Miramar University.

== Alumni ==
=== Pacific Western University (Hawaii) ===
- David Reardon, biomedical ethicist, holds a PhD in biomedical ethics from Pacific Western University (Hawaii).
- Jun Tang (唐俊), president and chief executive officer in Xin Hua Du Industrial Group Co., former CEO of SHANDA, former executive of Microsoft China Co., Ltd., received a PhD in electrical engineering from Pacific Western University (Hawaii) in 1996.
- Dan Voiculescu – Romanian politician and founder of the Conservative Party (Romania) holds a PhD from Pacific Western University (Hawaii).
- Rafael Galeano Andrades, Docente Universidad de Cartagena; doctorando 1988–1992 Decano Facultad de Ciencias Exactas y Naturales 2004-2014
- David Iadevaia, Ph.D. in Science Education 1992; Arizona Professor
- David Bishop, Ph.D. in Religious Studies 1994; Arizona Professor
- Moosa Bin Shamsher, businessman, Ph.D.

=== Pacific Western University (Louisiana) ===
- Einbarr "Barry" McSweeny – former chief science officer to the government of Ireland – holds a Ph.D. in biochemistry from Pacific Western University (Louisiana)

=== Pacific Western University (California) ===
- Bingu wa Mutharika, President of Malawi
- Earl Ofari Hutchinson, journalist, author, and broadcaster, has a PhD in sociology from Pacific Western University.
- Nai Pan Hla, Burmese historian and anthropologist
- Romulus Whitaker, herpetologist and wildlife conservationist, reports receiving a bachelor's degree in wildlife management from Pacific Western University in 1986.
- Sam Vaknin, Israeli author, lists a PhD from Pacific Western University in Encino, California, on his curriculum vitae, for study of the philosophy of physics.
- Sten Molin American Airlines Flight 587 crash pilot.
