= James Rhyne Killian =

American college president (1904–1988)

James Killian
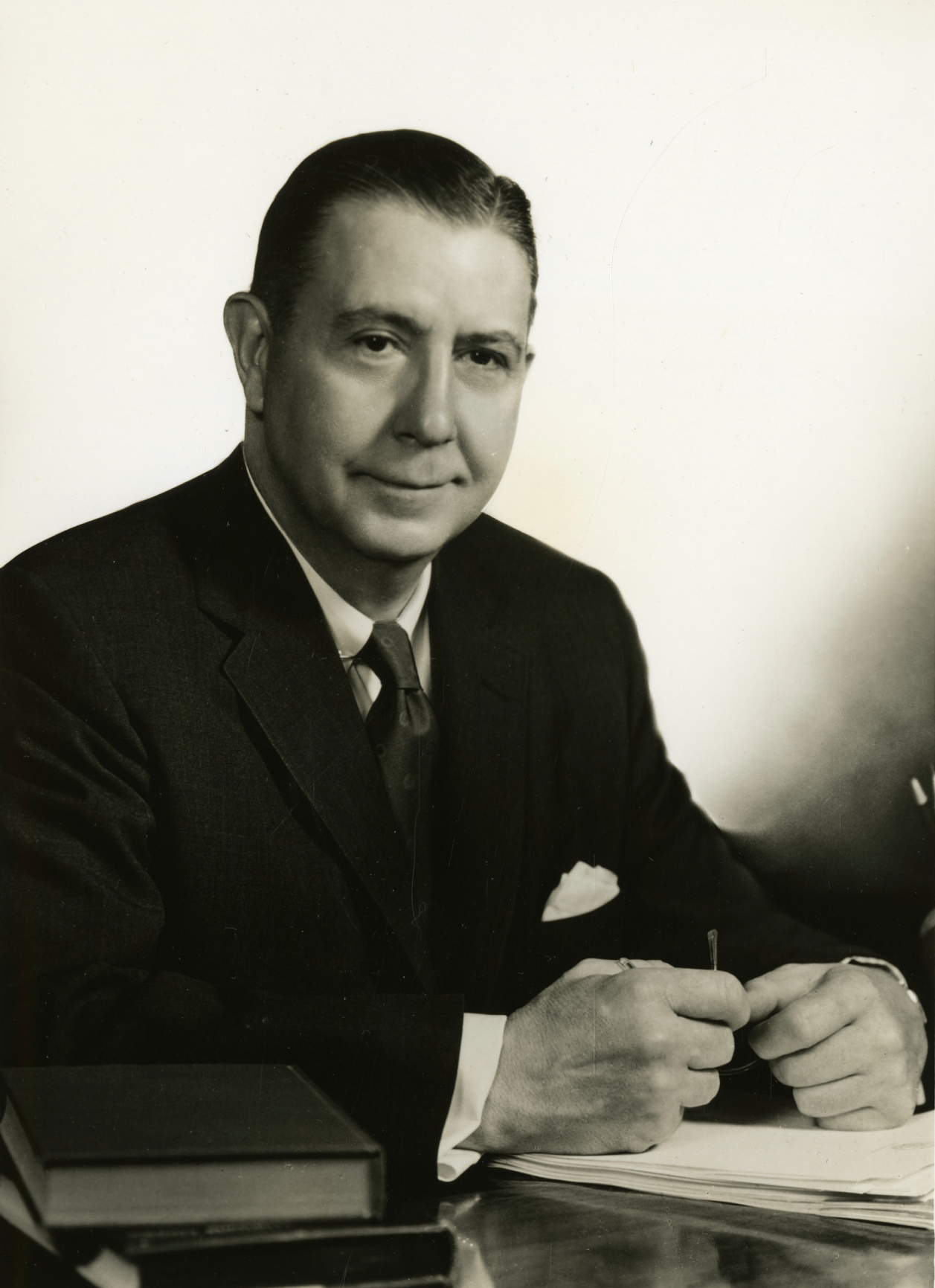

Chair of the President's Intelligence Advisory Board
- In office May 4, 1961 – April 23, 1963
- President: John F. Kennedy
- Preceded by: John Hull
- Succeeded by: Clark Clifford
- In office January 13, 1956 – March 1, 1958
- President: Dwight Eisenhower
- Preceded by: Position established
- Succeeded by: John Hull

Chairman of the President's Science Advisory Committee
- In office November 7, 1957 – July 1959
- President: Dwight D. Eisenhower
- Preceded by: Isidor Rabi
- Succeeded by: George Kistiakowsky

10th President of the Massachusetts Institute of Technology
- In office 1948–1959
- Preceded by: Karl Compton
- Succeeded by: Julius Stratton

Personal details
- Born: July 24, 1904 Blacksburg, South Carolina, U.S.
- Died: January 29, 1988 (aged 83) Cambridge, Massachusetts, U.S.
- Education: Duke University (attended); Massachusetts Institute of Technology (BS)
- Awards: Vannevar Bush Award (1980)

James Rhyne Killian Jr. (July 24, 1904 – January 29, 1988) was the 10th president of the Massachusetts Institute of Technology, from 1948 until 1959. He also held a number of government roles, such as Chair of the President's Intelligence Advisory Board under John F. Kennedy.

== Early life and education ==
Killian was born on July 24, 1904, in Blacksburg, South Carolina. His father was a textile maker. He attended The McCallie School in Chattanooga, Tennessee later studied at Duke University (formerly Trinity University) for two years until he transferred to MIT, where he received a Bachelor of Business Administration and engineering administration in 1926. While there, he was a member of the Sigma Chi fraternity.

== Career ==
=== Leadership at MIT ===
In 1932, while the editor of MIT's alumni magazine Technology Review, Killian was instrumental in the founding of Technology Press, the publishing imprint that would later become the institute's independent publishing house, MIT Press. He became executive assistant to MIT President Karl Taylor Compton in 1939, and co-directed the wartime operation of MIT, which strongly supported military research and development.

From 1948 until 1959, Killian was the 10th president of MIT. His administration encouraged the western expansion of campus, building Baker House, the Kresge Oval, and the Kresge Chapel, all significant modernist buildings. MIT's Sloan School of Management, School of Humanities and Social Sciences, and Lincoln Laboratory were established during his presidency.

=== Advisor to the President of the U.S. ===
In 1956, James R. Killian Jr was named as the 1st Chair to the new President's Foreign Intelligence Advisory Board by the Eisenhower Administration, a position which he held until April 1963.

Shortly after the October 1957 launches of the Soviet artificial satellites, Sputnik 1 and Sputnik 2, President Eisenhower asked Killian to serve as Special Assistant for Science and Technology, making him the first true Presidential Science Advisor. Killian took leave from MIT for two years to fill this new role. He headed the Killian Committee and oversaw the creation of the President's Science Advisory Committee (PSAC). PSAC was instrumental in initiating national curriculum reforms in science and technology and in establishing the National Aeronautics and Space Administration (NASA).

Killian described an environment of "widespread discouragement" facing scientists and, in particular, scientists of the Technological Capabilities Panel, which had been convened by U.S. President Dwight D. Eisenhower to develop technological solutions to the perceived possibility of a surprise nuclear attack by the Soviet Union. This stifling work atmosphere was caused by the widely cast, groundless aspersions of Senator Joseph McCarthy and the removal of Robert Oppenheimer from work on sensitive military projects. Oppenheimer had expressed support for shifting U.S. military resources from offensive nuclear weapons to defensive capabilities, and following Oppenheimer's loss of his security clearance, scientists felt that it was inadvisable to challenge the thinking of the military establishment.

=== Awards and autobiography ===
In 1956 Killian was awarded the Public Welfare Medal from the National Academy of Sciences. He co-authored a memoir, The Education of a College President (1985),. After stepping down as president of MIT in 1959, he was chairman of the MIT Corporation from 1959 to1971.

== Death ==
Killian died on January 29, 1988, in Cambridge, Massachusetts.

== Legacy ==
Two locations on MIT's campus bear the name Killian: Killian Court, a tree-lined courtyard with views of MIT's Great Dome, and Killian Hall, a concert hall (actually named after Killian's wife, Elizabeth Parks Killian, a Wellesley College alumna).

== See also ==
- List of presidents of the Massachusetts Institute of Technology
- List of institute professors at the Massachusetts Institute of Technology
- List of Sigma Chi members
- List of Unitarians, Universalists, and Unitarian Universalists
- List of Peabody Award winners (1960–1969)
- List of Peabody Award winners (1970–1979)

Academic offices
Preceded by Karl Compton	President of the Massachusetts Institute of Technology; 1948–1959	Succeeded by Julius Stratton
Government offices
New office	Chair of the President's Intelligence Advisory Board; 1956–1958	Succeeded by John Hull
Preceded by Isidor Rabi	Chairman of the President's Science Advisory Committee; 1957–1959	Succeeded by George Kistiakowsky
Preceded by John Hull	Chair of the President's Intelligence Advisory Board; 1961–1963	Succeeded by Clark Clifford
