= Government Chief Scientific Adviser (Ireland) =

Adviser to the Irish Government

The Irish Chief Scientific Adviser (CSA) is an adviser on science and technology to the Government of Ireland. The role was created in 2004 and was to operate independently of government departments, but report to the Cabinet Committee on Science and Technology.

== History ==
In 2004, Barry McSweeney was appointed as the first CSA. Following a controversy about the awarding of his PhD, McSweeney resigned in November 2005.

In January 2007, Patrick Cunningham was announced as the new CSA. He served a five-year term and hosted the 2012 EuroScience Open Forum meeting in Dublin.

In 2012, following the retirement of Cunningham, the separate office of CSA was abolished, and the role was given to Mark Ferguson, then director general of Science Foundation Ireland. Ferguson was reappointed in 2017 for a further five years. During this period, academics, politicians and others highlighted the limitations of having a non-independent science advisor.

Following the announcement of Philip Nolan's upcoming appointment as director general of Science Foundation Ireland, Simon Harris announced that the CSA was to be reinstated as an independent role.

In October 2024, Aoife McLysaght was appointed Government Science Advisor for the Republic of Ireland. The role is now called the Government Science Advisor and operates within the Department of Further and Higher Education, Research, Innovation and Science. In addition, in February 2026, a National Science Advice Forum chaired by the Government Science Advisor was appointed by Minister James Lawless to act as a group with broad scientific expertise to advise the government.

== List of Government Chief Scientific Advisers ==
- Barry McSweeney (2004-2005)
- Patrick Cunningham (2007-2012)
- Mark Ferguson (2012-2022)
- Aoife McLysaght (2024-present)
