= Irish Research Council =

Irish academic body

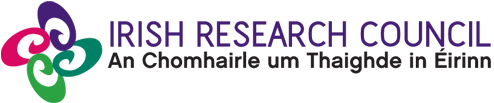
- Formation: March 2012
- Dissolved: 31 July 2024
- Merger of: Irish Research Council for Science Engineering and Technology (IRCSET) and Irish Research Council for Humanities and Social Sciences (IRCHSS)
- Location: Ballsbridge, Dublin, Ireland
- Key people: Peter Brown (Director); Jane Ohlmeyer (Chair)
- Website: Official website at the Wayback Machine (archived 2024-07-27)

The Irish Research Council (Irish: An Chomhairle um Thaighde in Éirinn) was an associate agency of the Department of Further and Higher Education, Research, Innovation and Science, under the aegis of the Higher Education Authority.

In November 2023, Simon Harris, the Minister for Further and Higher Education, Research, Innovation and Science, announced the intention of the government to establish Taighde Éireann as a successor body to both Science Foundation Ireland and the Irish Research Council. This was implemented by the Research and Innovation Act 2024.

== Function ==
The core function of the organisation is to support research across a number of disciplines and career stages. The council also has a role in supporting research with a "societal focus", and has established partnerships across government and civic society to this end.

The council provides competitive funding for postgraduate scholarships and for postdoctoral research fellowships in all disciplines. The Council also funds Principal Investigator-led research with a social, cultural and societal significance, it participates in a range of EU-funded projects, and it also partners on a number of initiatives with enterprise, employers, government departments and civic society.

== Mission ==
The Council's mission is to enable and sustain a research community in Ireland by supporting excellent researchers in all disciplines from arts to zoology.

Funding is made available through the Council's initiatives, in order to fund research in all disciplines at postgraduate, postdoctoral and principal investigator-led levels.

== Communication ==
In order to increase public awareness of the important research conducted in Irish higher education institutions, the Council launched an initiative in 2016 called #LoveIrishResearch. Where possible, researchers and institutions use the #LoveIrishResearch logo on all materials associated with, or arising from, research undertaken by an awardee in receipt of Council funding and/or by all those in receipt of funding or support for campaigns, events and/or other activities.

The #LoveIrishResearch campaign aims to connect members of the public with the amazing work being conducted by Irish-based researchers and highlight their achievements across multiple fields. This hashtag collects Irish Research related tweets. The Council also runs a blog communicating researchers achievements.

== Organisation ==
The Chair of the Irish Research Council is Jane Ohlmeyer, Erasmus Smith's Professor of Modern History at Trinity College Dublin and Director of the Trinity Long Room Hub. The Director of the Council is Mr Peter Brown, who was appointed on 17 October 2017, following the departure of the Council's inaugural director, Dr Eucharia Meehan.

The Council is governed by a board composed by a number of professors in higher education institutes in Ireland.

== Funding ==
The Council manages a suite of interlinked programmes funding researchers across all career stages and disciplines. It is the key national funder of basic research across all disciplines, and the only national funder that supports basic research in the arts, humanities and social sciences. The Council supports the career development of early-stage researchers; power enterprise and skills; cultivate Ireland's success under Horizon 2020; catalyse research addressing the grand societal challenges; provide access to research infrastructures and; communicate the value of research.

Selection for funding is based upon individual merit, and the decision process is overseen by independent assessment panels composed by internationally recognised experts. In 2016, the Council supported 1,629 researchers across a portfolio of awards worth in excess of €100 million.

== Partnership ==
To date, the Council has established over 320 enterprise and employment partners across our suite of enterprise programmes. These have included the Gaelic Athletic Association, IBM, Intel, Aylien and Nuritas. The Council has also 17 established partnerships across government and civic society to assist in supporting research with a societal focus. These include: Arts Council of Ireland, Crisis Pregnancy Programme, Department of Agriculture, Food and the Marine, Department of Arts, Heritage, Regional, Rural and Gaeltacht Affairs, Department of Children, Equality, Disability, Integration and Youth, Department of Foreign Affairs, Department of Social Protection, Environmental Protection Agency, Geological Survey of Ireland, Higher Education Authority, Health Research Board, Irish Human Rights and Equality Commission, National Forum for the Enhancement of Teaching and Learning, Science Foundation Ireland, Sustainable Energy Authority of Ireland, Teagasc, Tusla - Child and Family Agency.

The council's international partnerships and networks include: Irish Marie Skłodowska-Curie Office, Humanities in the European Research Area, Horizon 2020, Lindau Nobel Laureate Meetings, European Space Agency, GENDER-NET Plus ERA-NET, NORFACE, CHIST-ERA, Science Europe, Embassy of France in Ireland & Campus France, Vitae.

== Researcher of the Year ==
Since 2017, the Council has held the "Researcher of the Year" awards, in the categories of Researcher of the Year, Early Career Researcher of the Year and the Impact Award, to celebrate the work of Researchers in Ireland.

=== Recipients ===
Recipients of the overall award:

- 2020 Dr. Jane Suiter MRIA, Institute for Future Media and Journalism (FuJo), DCU
- 2019 Prof. Laoise McNamara, Biomedical Engineering, NUI Galway
- 2018 Prof. Anna Davies, Environmental Governance Research Group, Trinity College
- 2017 Dr. Martin O'Halloran, Director of the Translational Medical Device Lab, NUI Galway

== History ==
The Irish Research Council was created in 2012 by the Department of Education and Skills by merging two existing research councils: the Irish Research Council for Science Engineering and Technology (IRCSET) and Irish Research Council for Humanities and Social Sciences (Irish: An Comhairle um Thaighde sna Dána agus sna hEolachtaí Sóisialta) (IRCHSS).

The Social Science Research Council (Ireland) was part of the Royal Irish Academy and it functioned from 1995 until 1999. In 1999 the SSRC was dissolved in order to create the Irish Research Council for Humanities and Social Sciences (IRCHSS). The IRCHSS later merged in 2012 with the Irish Research Council for Science Engineering and Technology (IRCSET) to form the Irish Research Council.

Prior to this, other higher education funding institutions existed in Ireland.

- 1995: Establishment of the Social Science Research Council (Ireland) (SSRC) of the Royal Irish Academy, a forerunner of the IRCHSS. The SSRC provided scholarship and fellowships for research in Social Sciences up until the creation of the IRCHSS.
- 1999: Minister for Education and Science, Mr Micheál Martin, TD, formally establishes the IRCHSS in December. This followed the recommendations set in a report by Dr Maurice J. Bric.
- 2001: The IRCSET was established in June by the Minister for Education and Science. Launched the basic research grant scheme, jointly with Enterprise Ireland in December.
- 2002: The IRCSET launched the Embark scholarships for postgraduate research.
- 2003: The IRCSET launched the Empower postdoctoral fellowship awards.
- 2004 The IRCSET launched the Enterprise Partnership Scheme, which co-funded postgraduate scholarships and postdoctoral fellowships along with small and large companies.
- 2006: The IRCSET launched the Graduate Research Education Programme exploratory grant awards, adopted a new approach to PhD funding to add to the Embark scholarships.
- 2007: Launched the call for funding for the Graduate Research Education Programme.
- 2012: The IRCSET and the IRCHSS merge to form the Irish Research Council, Director Dr Eucharia Meehan appointed.
- 2016: The Irish Research Council awarded projects worth in excess of €100 million. It directly funded 298 postdoctoral fellows and 1,067 postgraduate students.

In October 2020, responsibility for the IRC (under the HEA) was transferred from the Department of Education and Skills to the Department of Further and Higher Education, Research, Innovation and Science.

In November 2023, Simon Harris, the Minister for Further and Higher Education, Research, Innovation and Science, announced the intention of the government to establish Taighde Éireann as a successor body to both Science Foundation Ireland and the Irish Research Council. This was implemented by the Research and Innovation Act 2024. Patrick O'Donovan, Harris's successor as minister, set 1 August as the establishment date of Taighde Éireann.
