= Barry McSweeney =

Barry McSweeney (died 22 October 2014) was an Irish scientist who was the first Chief Science Advisor to the Government of Ireland.

== Education and career ==
McSweeney was born in Cork, Ireland. He attended University College Cork, graduating in 1972 with a BSc Honours degree in Biochemistry. Subsequently, he obtained an MSc in Clinical biochemistry at Trinity College Dublin. In 1994, he received a PhD degree in Biochemistry and Biotechnology from Pacific Western University, an unaccredited institution in the United States.

From 1987 and 1995 McSweeney was founding director of BioResearch Ireland, an organization focused on establishing Ireland as a location for biotechnology investment. He also worked as Director of Medical Business for Biocon Biochemicals in Cork and Sées, France, and as European Product Development Manager for the American Hospital Supply Corporation. He chaired the Organisation for Economic Co-operation and Development (OECD) Working Party on Biotechnology in 1994-1995 and served as a member of the Advisory Committee on Biotechnology in Science Foundation Ireland in 2000.

From 2000 to 2004, McSweeney headed the Directorate-General Joint Research Centre of European Commission, an organisation of 2,400 staff and with a budget of 340 million euro. He was responsible for the development and expansion of the European Commission's Marie Curie Research Mobility Scheme to provide research and employment opportunities to young scientists.

Ireland established the office of Chief Science Advisor to the Government in 2004 and McSweeney took up the position on 1 September 2004.

== Diploma controversy ==
McSweeney was forced to resign from his position as Chief Science Advisor after the Irish Independent discovered in October 2005 that his Ph.D. degree was from an unaccredited institution that had been "the subject of numerous official investigations, state bans and media exposés" in the United States, and that it had been obtained after just 12 months of study. The opposition political parties, the Labour Party and Fine Gael, criticised the government for failing to properly assess McSweeney's qualifications.

After leaving the science adviser position, he was appointed to a position as research coordinator in Ireland's Department of Communications Marine and Natural Resources.

== Recognitions ==
In 2003 he received the Great Gold Medal of Comenius University in Bratislava for his contributions to European Union enlargement.
