= John E. Hull =

United States Army general

John Hull
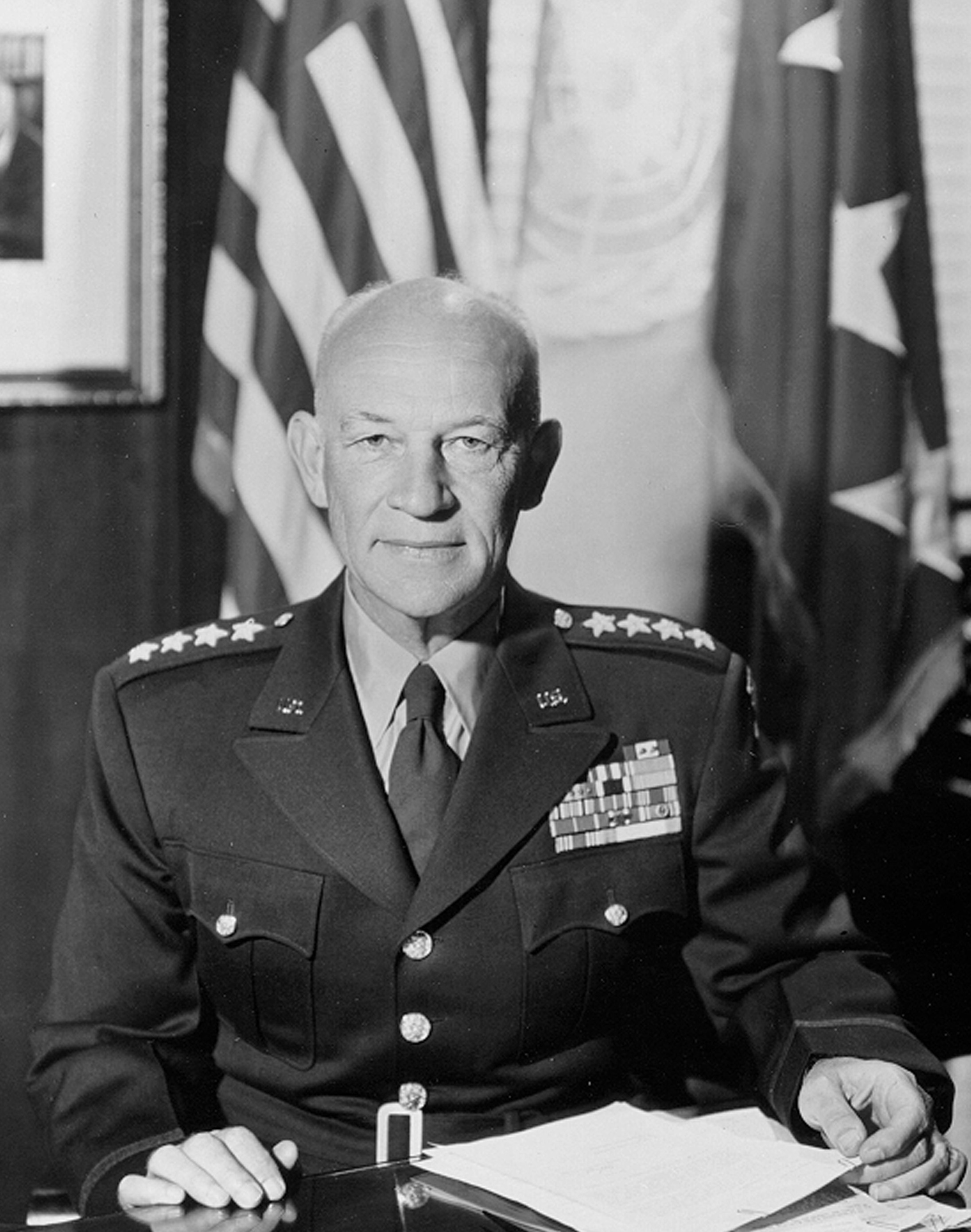
- Hull in 1953

Chair of the President's Intelligence Advisory Board
- In office 1 March 1958 – 20 January 1961
- President: Dwight Eisenhower
- Preceded by: James Killian
- Succeeded by: James Killian

Governor of the Ryukyu Islands
- In office 7 October 1953 – 1 April 1955
- President: Dwight Eisenhower
- Preceded by: Mark Clark
- Succeeded by: Max Taylor

Personal details
- Born: 26 May 1895 Greenfield, Ohio, U.S.
- Died: 10 June 1975 (aged 80) Washington, D.C., U.S.
- Education: Miami University (BS)
- Awards: Distinguished Service Medal; Silver Star; Legion of Merit

Military service
- Allegiance: United States
- Branch/service: United States Army
- Years of service: 1917–1955
- Rank: General
- Commands: Far East Command; United States Army Pacific
- Battles/wars: World War I World War II; Korean War

John Edwin Hull (26 May 1895 – 10 June 1975) was a United States Army general, former Vice Chief of Staff of the United States Army, commanded Far East Command from 1953 to 1955 and the U.S. Army, Pacific from 1948 to 1949. He served in both world wars and was a contemporary of generals George Marshall and Omar Bradley. Because of his primary role in planning Allied operations throughout World War II, he was credited with having more experience integrating strategy with overseas operations than any other Army officer.

== Biography ==
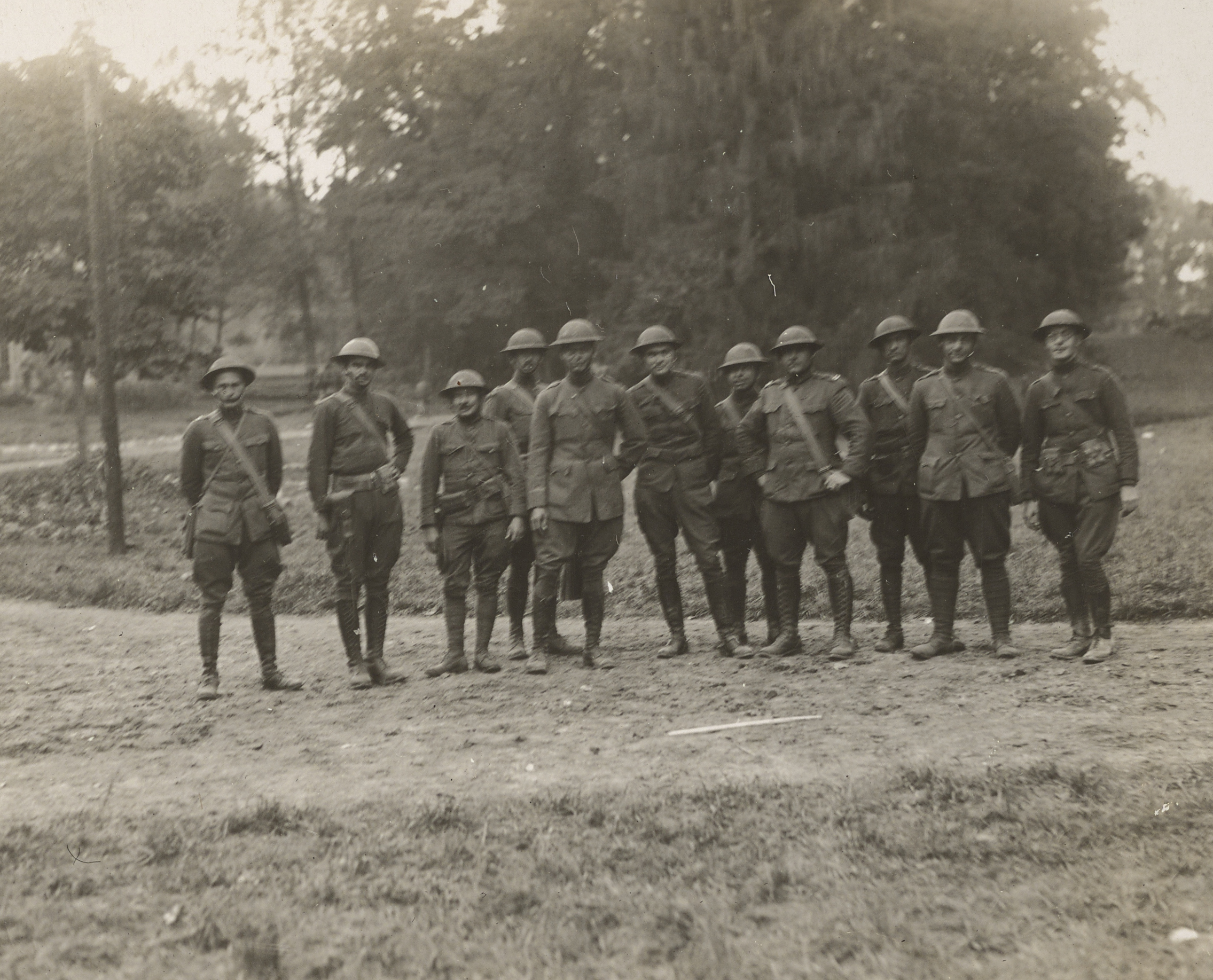
Officers of the 2nd Battalion, 58th Infantry, 4th Division, France, 5 August 1918. The commander of Company E, First Lieutenant John E. Hull, is stood on the far right in the front row.

Hull was a pre-medical student at Miami University in Oxford, Ohio, prior to joining the Army in 1917. He received an honorary LLD in 1954. His military education included the Army War College and the National War College.

Prior to the U.S. Army, Pacific, Hull was the Commanding General for Army Ground Forces in the Pacific. From 1953 to 1955 he was Commander in Chief of the Far East Command after the conclusion of the Korean War. This was his last major assignment before retiring on 30 April 1955.

He was Chair of the President's Intelligence Advisory Board under president Dwight Eisenhower from 1 March 1958 to 20 January 1961.

Other significant assignments for Hull involved major staff duties in Washington, D.C. Among these were Director of the Weapons Evaluation Group and Deputy Chief of Staff for Operations and Administration for the Office of the Secretary of Defense. At the outbreak of World War II he was assigned to the War Department.

Hull died on 10 June 1975, at the age of 80.

== Awards and decorations ==
Distinguished Service Medal with two oak leaf clusters
Silver Star
Legion of Merit
World War I Victory Medal with four service stars
World War II Victory Medal
Korean Service Medal
United Nations Service Medal for Korea

Army Staff Identification Badge

== Bibliography ==
- Hull, John Edwin (1978). The Autobiography of General John Edwin Hull, 1895-1975. M. Anderson.

Military offices
Preceded by Wade Haislip	Vice Chief of Staff of the United States Army; 1951–1953	Succeeded by Charles Bolte
Political offices
Preceded by Mark Clark	Governor of the Ryukyu Islands; 1953–1955	Succeeded by Max Taylor
Government offices
Preceded by James Killian	Chair of the President's Intelligence Advisory Board; 1958–1961	Succeeded by James Killian
