= Conceptual combination =

Cognitive Process

Conceptual combination is a fundamental cognitive process by which two or more existing basic concepts are mentally synthesized to generate a composite, higher-order concept. The products of this process are sometimes referred to as "complex concepts." Combining concepts allows individuals to use a finite number of concepts which they already understand to construct a potentially limitless quantity of new, related concepts. It is an essential component of many abilities, such as perception, language, synthetic reasoning, creative thought and abstraction.

Conceptual combination is an important concept in the fields of cognitive psychology and cognitive science.

== Mechanism ==
The mechanism by which conceptual combination occurs is debatable, both on cognitive and neurological levels. As such, multiple models have been developed or applied to better define how the process occurs.

=== Cognitive ===
Cognitive models attempt to functionally outline the mental computation involved in conceptual combination.

==== Constraint Theory ====
Constraint theory stipulates that the concept that results from an attempt at conceptual combination is controlled by three constraints known as diagnosticity, plausibility and informativeness. Diagnosticity refers to the a complex concept's possession of the defining properties of its component simple concepts. Because such properties are diagnostic of the component concepts, at least some of them should be diagnostic of the higher-order representations constructed from those concepts. Plausibility refers to consistency with existing knowledge and prior experience. It is based on the assumption that a complex concept should be reasonably relevant to the context in which it is used. This assumption makes the most sense in a practical, linguistic context, particularly when a speaker is catering to the understanding of the listener. Informativeness is the property of having more meaning or properties than any individual component. If a complex concept were not distinguishable from any given component, it would be identical to that component. Because nothing can logically be both a component of something and the totality of something simultaneously, a complex concept must at least be the sum of its parts. Many argue that the interaction among component concepts should allow a complex concept to be greater than that sum. If multiple possible ways to structure or interpret a complex concept exist, the one which best satisfies or most satisfies these constraints is the one which will be used. The paradigm upon which constraint theory is based is computational, and therefore views the mind as a processor which operates on the basis of standard problem-solving protocols (i.e. algorithms and heuristics).

==== Spreading Activation ====
The spreading activation model is a model in connectionist theory sometimes designed to represent how concepts are activated in relation to one another. Though it is typically applied to information search processes like recognition, brainstorming, and recall, it can be used to explain how concepts are combined as well as connected.

Spreading activation models represent memory and knowledge as a network of interlinked concepts. Every concept manifests as a node within this network, with related nodes/concepts linked to one another with connections. Concepts that are more strongly associated with one another either in terms of content or an individual's past experience are correspondingly more strongly linked.

When one concept is employed in working memory, the corresponding node is also activated. This activation spreads through the node's links, making it easier to activate nodes to which the activated node is connected. This spreading activation stimulates the linked nodes, pressuring them to activate to an extent proportional to the strength of the connection between the stimulating node and the stimulated node. If sufficient net stimulation is accrued through a stimulated node's links, it will also activate. Thus, being connected to an activated node makes it easier for an inactive node to become active as well; concepts become more readily accessed when individuals are stimulated with related concepts first. This increase in ease of access is known as "priming."

Spreading activation models tend to imply that processing concepts occurs in series; that is, each concept is processed one-at-a-time, one after the other. As such, individuals tend to combine concepts more readily, easily, and quickly if they are more closely linked within the network of concepts. This implication, however, has caused spreading activation to come under a great deal of criticism, particularly with respect to how the concept is employed in feature theories.

==== Feature-Based Theories ====
The features and properties of complex concepts are generally assumed to be derived from the simple concepts that compose them. One popularly discussed model involves a two-stage serial process. In the initial stage, features from each of the component simple concepts are retrieved from memory through spreading activation. This allows a complex concept to accrue features with existing relationships with its component simple concepts. During this stage, the basic definition of what the complex concept is and/or means is generates. In the second stage, knowledge and reasoning are employed upon the features accrued in the previous stage to generate further features. For example, one might reason that the complex concept "white jacket," if worn in a blizzard, would make one difficult to see; it would follow that one should ascribe the property of "good for winter camouflage," despite the fact that this property is not closely attached to the component concepts "white" nor "jacket." This stage is especially useful when properties of complex concepts contradict those of their component concepts, such as the different colours of milk and chocolate milk.

This model, however, has come under criticism due to its inconsistency with empirical studies. If conceptual combination employed serial spreading activation, for instance, it should take longer to verify the properties of complex concepts, as they necessarily possess more concepts than their component simple concepts. Research has nonetheless shown that it takes less time to confirm complex concepts' properties than their components and about equal time to reject false properties for both. This occurred even when the properties of the complex concept contradicted those of the simple concepts. Likewise, when experiment participants are exposed to a set of features first, and then asked to verify whether or not they correspond to simple or complex concepts, the participants tend to provide correct verification answers for the complex concepts more quickly.

=== Neurological ===
The neurological basis of conceptual combination has received considerably less attention than its cognitive basis. Nevertheless, research has revealed several specific brain regions that are intimately involved if not entirely responsible for neural processing involved in conceptual combination.

Of particular relevance is the left anterior temporal lobe. Studies have previously demonstrated an additive effect for stimulation in this subsection of neural cortex tissue. When experiment participants were verbally presented with certain simple concepts, the processing of the information causes electrical stimulation in the region. When the same participants were verbally presented with a single complex concept formed from the combination of the aforementioned simple concepts, the stimulation recorded was equivalent to the sum of the stimulation that resulted from each individual component simple concept. In other words, the stimulation caused by a complex concept is equivalent to the total stimulation caused by its component concepts. More recent data contradicts those results by indicating a multiplicative effect in which the activation caused by a complex concept is the product of the activation levels caused by its component concepts, rather than the sum.

Further support for the role of the left anterior temporal lobe has been previously established through neuropsychological studies. Semantic dementia is a disorder in which conceptual manipulation, including conceptual combination, is hindered. These indicate that the neural damage associated with semantic dementia occurs within this brain region. Unfortunately, neuropsychological studies that attempt to replicate this pattern have failed, leading uncertainty as to whether initial results were valid.

== Language ==
As language is the means by which concepts are communicated and expressed, the processed involved in linguistic expression and interpretation are heavily intertwined with combined concepts. Many theories of concept combination mechanisms, including constraint theory were developed within the context of language, and therefore make more sense when applied in a linguistic context. Study into the linguistic aspects of concept combination as has generally been focused on the interpretation mechanism.

=== Lexical Concepts ===
A concept that can be expressed using a single word is called a lexical concept. A lexical concept is usually treated as a basic concept, although it can just as easily be a complex concept.

Two lexical concepts are often used together as phrases to represent a combined concept of greater specificity. This is most readily seen in the use of adjectives to modify nouns and the use of adverbs to modify verbs and adjectives. Consider, for example, phrases such as "burnt toast," "eat roughly," and "readily loved." Multiple noun lexical concepts can also be used together in order to represent combined concepts. Through this process, a limited pool of nouns can be used to produce an exponentially larger pool of phrases such as "sound wave," "video game," and "sleeping pill."

=== Interpretation ===
In addition to constraint theory, there are two principal theories surrounding the mechanism by which noun-noun combinations are interpreted. The first of these is dual-process theory. Dual-process theory proposed that there are two means by which people interpreted noun-noun phrases. Relational interpretation attempts to establish a relationship between the nouns and interprets the combined phrase in terms of that relationship. For example, one might relationally interpret the phrase "snake mouse" to refer to a mouse meant to be eaten by snakes, as the two concepts have a predatory relationship. Property interpretation identifies properties associated with the first noun and then applies them onto the second noun. In this case the phrase "snake mouse" might be interpreted as a mouse with poisonous fangs or an elongated body.

The second principal theory is known as the Competition in Relations among Nominals theory. It states that the assumed modification effect of a noun on its partner in a novel noun-noun combination is the one which it has been seen to employ most often in the past. For example, "chocolate cat" is usually interpreted as "a cat made of chocolate" rather than "a chocolate-eating cat" simply because the "made of" modifier is heavily conditioned to be associated with "chocolate."

Explanations of linguistic expression of complex concepts have been linked to spreading activation models. When an individual identifies a lexical concept through vision or hearing, the corresponding node in that individual's cognitive network is said to activate. This makes it easier for lexical concepts linked to the activated concept to be comprehended, as they are primed. This is consistent with current empirical data, which shows that when individuals are interpreting sentences, they process the linguistic content more quickly when several related words follow one another. In turn, it becomes easier for people to combine these related concepts together and understand them as a relationship, rather than two distinct entities. For example, consider the example, "John spread butter on a bagel." In this sentence, the lexical concepts "spread," "butter," and "bagel" are associated with one another and easy to combine into a mental representation of a breakfast scenario. Conversely, consider the example, "John baked a computer." Because "baked" and "computer" are not related lexical concepts, it takes more effort and time to build a mental representation of this unusual scenario.

However, spreading activation models of conceptual combination have been criticized in light of how humans have been observed to combined languages. Those who claim that the theory provides an insufficient account of linguistic conceptual combination refer to the ability of humans to readily understand lexical concept combinations with seemingly no apparent connection with one another. One example of this would be the sentence "John saw an elephant cloud." "Elephant" and "cloud" do not shared a close association, but it takes little effort to comprehend that the term "elephant cloud" refers to a cloud shaped like an elephant. This has led some to conclude that the combination of lexical concepts does not wholly rely on the simultaneous activation of linked lexical concepts alone. Rather, they claim that the process involves the use of existing nodes to generate entirely new concepts independent of their parent concepts.

Recently, within the interpretation framework of concept combination, in the context of cognitive modelling and cognitively inspired AI systems, it has been developed a probabilistic logical framework, embedding the head-modifier cognitive heuristics, able to account for complex human-like noun-noun concept combinations (like the PET-FISH problem). Such a framework has been used and tested as a generative tool for autonomous systems.

==== Social Context ====
Although many theories of novel noun-noun combination interpretation ignore the effect of social environment, some theorists have attempted to account for any contingencies social context may cause.

When lexical concept combinations are interpreted without the influence of social context, the interpretation carried out is termed sense generation. This includes all processes that would normally occur excepting those dependent on a conversation partner. The generation hypothesis accordingly states that the interpretation mechanism of a noun-noun combination is essentially the same regardless of context. This does not rule out the possibility that social context can affect sense generation in some way, but it does assert that the basic structure of the process is unaffected. As seen above, debate as to what sense generation entails and how many sub-processes into which it should be divided is a contentious matter in cognitive science.

The anaphor resolution hypothesis instead asserts that before sense generation occurs, interpreters first search their memory of recent communication to see if the combination refers to something previously discussed. This process is termed anaphor resolution. If a referent is identified, interpretation occurs without sense generation in light of that referent. Even if an explicit referent does not exist, anaphor resolution can help facilitate sense generation by providing more information that might hint at the combination's intended meaning.

The dual-process hypothesis not to be confused with dual-process theory, states that sense generation and anaphor resolution occur in parallel. Both processes begin to work once the noun-noun combination is presented. Proponents of this hypothesis disagree as to how the interpretation is eventually resolves. Some believe that whichever process reaches a conclusion first provides the answer. Others believe that both provide continuous input to a third, mediating process that eventually makes a decision based on input from both.

== Creativity ==
Creativity necessitates the employment of existing concepts in novel ways, and therefore requires conceptual combination. Surprisingly, this contribution seems to be limited. Conceptual combination is a significant contributor to convergent thinking, but not divergent thinking. For example, practice with generating new concepts through combination does not improve brainstorming. It does, however, assist in devising creative problem solving methods.

== Educational applications ==
The psychological community's growing understanding of how concepts are manipulated has allowed educators to teach new concepts more effectively. Tools that are developed based on conceptual combination theory attempt to teach individual tasks, and then challenge students to exercise them together in order to promote both base subject skills and the critical thinking needed to apply them simultaneously to solve new problems. Máder & Vajda, for instance, developed a three-dimensional grid with cells of adjustable height which has been successfully used in numerous activities capable of improving the effectiveness of high school mathematics education.
