= Department of Further and Higher Education, Research, Innovation and Science =

Irish government department

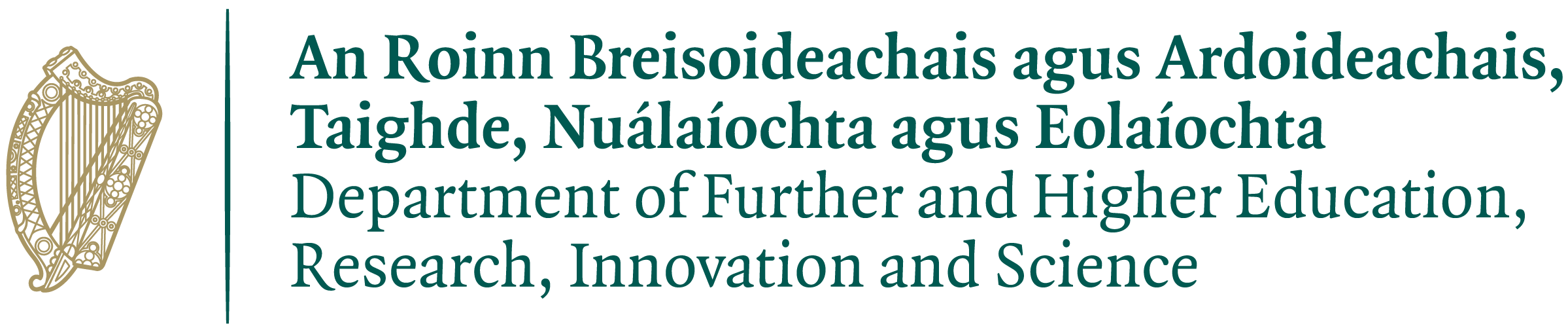

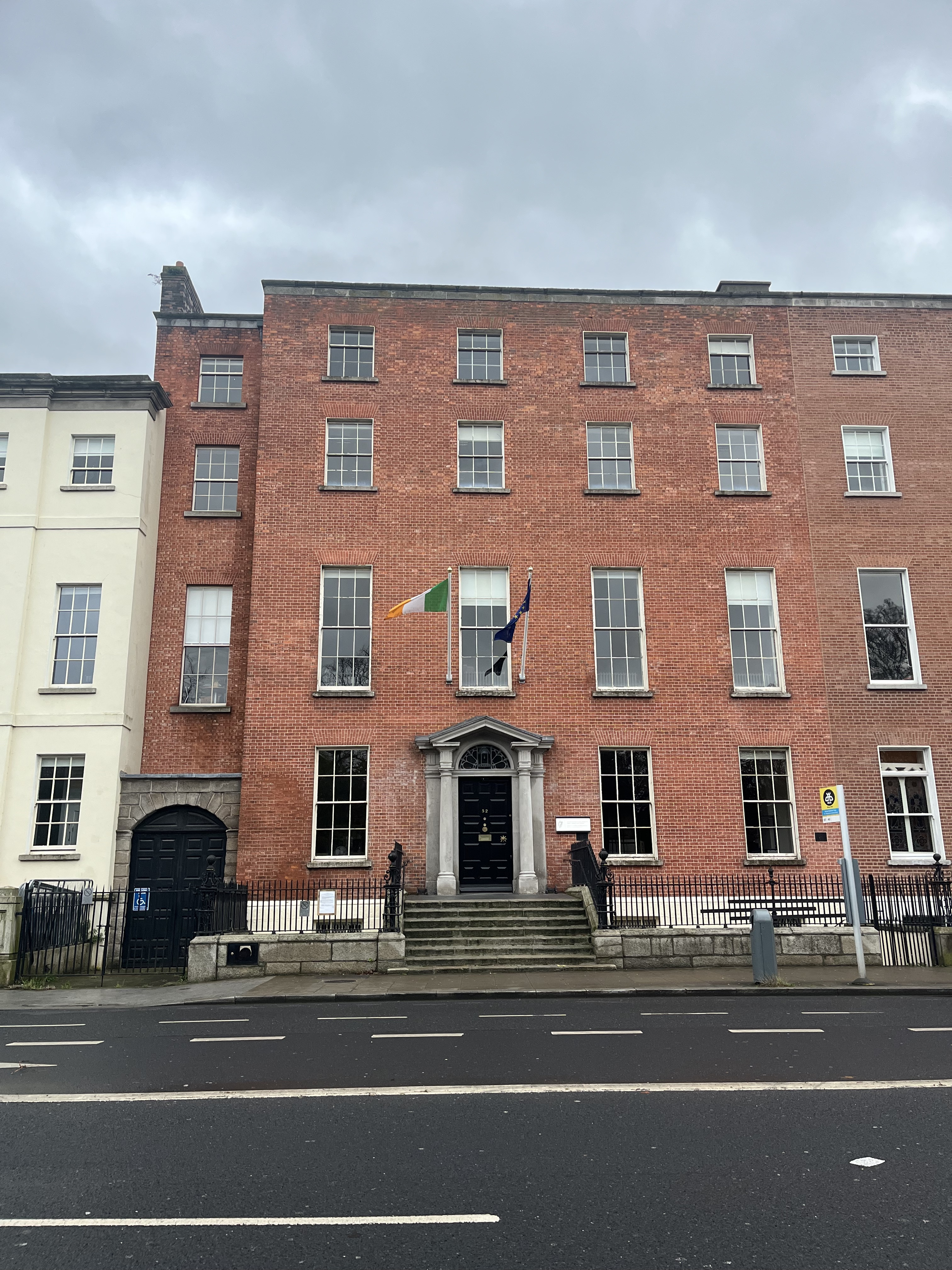
- Department headquarters on St Stephen's Green

Department overview
- Formed: 2 August 2020 (6 years ago)
- Jurisdiction: Government of Ireland
- Headquarters: 52 St Stephen's Green, Dublin, Ireland
- Minister responsible: James Lawless, Minister for Further and Higher Education, Research, Innovation and Science
- Department executive: Colm O'Reardon, Secretary General
- Website: gov.ie/dfheris

The Department of Further and Higher Education, Research, Innovation and Science (Irish: An Roinn Breisoideachais agus Ardoideachais, Taighde, Nuálaíochta agus Eolaíochta) is a department of the Government of Ireland. It is led by the Minister for Further and Higher Education, Research, Innovation and Science.

The department is responsible for policy and funding in further education, higher education, research, innovation, science and skills. It also oversees state agencies and public institutions operating in these areas.

== Departmental team ==
As of May 2026, the departmental team consists of the following:

- Minister for Further and Higher Education, Research, Innovation and Science: James Lawless, TD
  - Minister of State with responsibility for further education, apprenticeship, construction and climate skills: Marian Harkin, TD
- Secretary General of the Department: Colm O'Reardon

The Government Science Advisor is based in the department. Professor Aoife McLysaght was appointed to the role in 2024 and serves as Assistant Secretary in the Office of the Government Science Advisor.

== History ==
The Department of Further and Higher Education, Research, Innovation and Science was created by the Ministers and Secretaries and Ministerial, Parliamentary, Judicial and Court Offices (Amendment) Act 2020 as part of the reorganisation of governmental departments in the government of Micheál Martin.

=== Transfer of functions ===
Date	Change
2 August 2020	Establishment of the Department of Further and Higher Education, Research, Innovation and Science
21 October 2020	Transfer of Further and Higher Education, Research and Science from the Department of Education
1 January 2021	Transfer of Research Policy and Programmes from the Department of Enterprise, Trade and Employment

== Responsibilities ==
The department funds and develops policy for the further education, higher education and research sectors, and oversees the work of state agencies and public institutions operating in those areas. Its policy areas include further and higher education, research and innovation, and skills.

The department's Statement of Strategy 2025–2028 identifies four strategic priorities: fostering research and innovation as an economic enabler; providing accessible tertiary education; expanding pathways to skills, reskilling and apprenticeships; and promoting knowledge as a public good.

== State agencies ==
The state agencies under the aegis of the department include:

- SOLAS
- Grangegorman Development Agency
- Higher Education Authority
- Taighde Éireann – Research Ireland
- Léargas – The Exchange Bureau
- Quality and Qualifications Ireland
- Skillnet Ireland

== Taighde Éireann – Research Ireland ==
Taighde Éireann – Research Ireland is a statutory research and innovation funding agency under the aegis of the department. It was established on 1 August 2024 under the Research and Innovation Act 2024, amalgamating the activities and functions of Science Foundation Ireland and the Irish Research Council.

The agency was established to promote and support the contribution of research and innovation to Ireland's economic, social, cultural and environmental development and sustainability, and to strengthen collaboration between the research and innovation system and enterprise, government, public bodies, the voluntary sector and society. Michael Horgan was appointed chairperson of the agency's board in 2024, and Dr Diarmuid O'Brien was appointed chief executive officer in 2025.
