= Science Foundation Ireland =

Statutory research funding body

SFI overview
- Formed: 25 July 2003
- Dissolved: 31 July 2024
- Jurisdiction: Ireland
- Headquarters: Three Park Place, Hatch Street Upper, Dublin 2, Ireland D02 FX65
- SFI executives: Dr Ciáran Seoighe, Acting Director General; Peter Clinch, Chairperson
- Parent department: Department of Further and Higher Education, Research, Innovation and Science
- Key document: Industrial Development (Science Foundation Ireland) Act 2003
- Website: https://www.sfi.ie/

Science Foundation Ireland (SFI; Irish: Fondúireacht Eolaíochta Éireann) was a statutory body in Ireland. It was an agency of the Department of Further and Higher Education, Research, Innovation and Science, with responsibility for funding oriented basic and applied research in the areas of science, technology, engineering and mathematics (STEM) with a strategic focus. The board of SFI was appointed by the Minister for Further and Higher Education, Research, Innovation and Science.

== History ==
The agency was established in 2003 under the Industrial Development (Science Foundation Ireland) Act 2003.

Following a Technology Foresight activity managed by Forfás, the Irish Government allocated €1.3bn under the 2000–2006 National Development Plan to spend on R&D. SFI was responsible for disbursing €650M of these monies in the targeted strategic areas of ICT and Biotechnology during this period.

After an initial call for research proposals in 2000, the first Director General, Dr William Harris, joined SFI in 2001 leading the organization to the establishment of a range of research programmes from Principal Investigator Awards to large research centers, called Centers for Science & Engineering Technology.

In 2006, under the next National Development Plan, under the Strategy for Science, Technology & Innovation (SSTI), the Irish Government allotted a further €3.7B to spend on R&D. A more recent and significant amendment to the SFI Act in 2013 widened SFI's remit further to include both oriented basic research and applied research. The extension of SFI's remit to include applied research enables the outcome of oriented basic research funded by SFI to be taken closer to market.

The foundation signed the Berlin Declaration on Open Access to Knowledge in the Sciences and Humanities in February 2009.

In January 2021, SFI was transferred from the Department of Enterprise, Trade and Employment to the Department of Further and Higher Education, Research, Innovation and Science.

In November 2023, Simon Harris, the Minister for Further and Higher Education, Research, Innovation and Science, announced the intention of the government to establish Taighde Éireann as a successor body to both Science Foundation Ireland and the Irish Research Council. This was implemented by the Research and Innovation Act 2024. Patrick O'Donovan, Harris's successor as minister, set 1 August as the establishment date of Taighde Éireann.

Science Foundation Ireland was dissolved on 31 July 2024.

== Organisation ==
=== Remit ===
Science Foundation Ireland (SFI) is the national foundation for investment in scientific and engineering research. SFI invests in academic researchers and research teams who are most likely to generate new knowledge, leading edge technologies and competitive enterprises in the fields of science, technology, engineering and maths (STEM). The foundation also promotes and supports the study of, education in, and engagement with STEM and promotes an awareness and understanding of the value of STEM to society and, in particular, to the growth of the economy. SFI makes grants based upon the merit review of distinguished scientists. SFI also facilitates co-operative efforts among education, government, and industry that support its fields of emphasis and promotes Ireland's ensuing achievements around the world. When applying to SFI, applicants will be asked to justify the alignment of their research with Call- or Programme-specific themes and/or they will be required to describe the alignment of their research or activities with SFI's legal remit, as outlined below. Eligible research areas, or themes, may vary according to the scope and objectives of an individual programme and are described in the relevant call documentation. Details of individual programmes are included in the SFI Annual Plan.

=== Structure ===
==== Chairpersons of SFI ====
#	Name	Appointed	Retired
1.	Dr Pat Fottrell	2003	2011
2.	Ann Riordan	2011	2018
3.	Peter Clinch	2019	2024

==== Directors General of SFI ====
#	Name	Appointed	Retired
1.	Dr William Harris	2001	2006
2.	Prof Mark Keane	2006	2007
3.	Prof Frank Gannon	2007	2011
4.	Prof Mark Ferguson	2012	2022
5.	Prof Philip Nolan	2022	2024

Graham Love acted as interim Director General of SFI from the departure of Frank Gannon until the appointment of Mark Ferguson.

== Funding Programmes ==
SFI provides grants for researchers from around the world who wish to relocate to Ireland and those already based in Ireland, for outstanding investigators, for conferences and symposia, and for collaboration with industry. Proposals are evaluated in open competitions via a combination of international peer review and strategic fit with SFI's mission.

Science Foundation Ireland funds early- and mid-career researchers to become fully independent research leaders and collaborates with a number of UK based funding agencies, such as the Wellcome Trust, The Royal Society and the Biotechnology and Biological Sciences Research Council (BBSRC). These partnerships work, in some cases, by sharing the funding costs between the two agencies or in others, by facilitating Irish entry into the UK based fellowship.

=== Transitioning to Independence ===
Applies to early career researchers ready to embark on a career independent of their current supervisor; they will have a track record of research activity including senior author publications and will demonstrate an upward trajectory; they should be capable of describing research plans that fit into a national and international context and be starting to show evidence of independence and international recognition. Applicants to the SFI Starting Investigator Research Grant (SIRG), Royal Society-SFI University Research Fellowship and Wellcome Trust Research Career Development Fellowships are considered to be at the transition-to-independence stage.

=== Transitioning to Leadership ===
Applies to early and mid career researchers who have already demonstrated research independence. The SFI Career Development Award (CDA), Wellcome Trust Senior Research Fellowships in Basic Biomedical Science and Future Research Leader applicants are considered at the transition-to-leadership stage of their career.

=== Established Investigators and Leaders ===
SFI Investigators Programme funds the development of high caliber research capability and human capital in areas of science, technology, engineering and mathematics (STEM) that demonstrably support and underpin enterprise competitiveness and societal development in Ireland.

SFI Research Professorship Programme supports national research bodies in the recruitment of researchers for Professorial Chairs, or similar research leadership positions in targeted scientific areas in all areas covered by SFI's legal remit. The programme can also act as a mechanism to support the recruitment of individuals who possess a strong industry background, as well as for directorship roles in established research centres within eligible research bodies in Ireland.

=== Industry Programmes ===
The Industry Fellowship programme funds the bi-directional movement of academic and industry researchers. Fellowships can be awarded to academic researchers wishing to spend time in industry worldwide and to individuals from industry anywhere in the world (including Ireland) wishing to spend time in an eligible Irish Research Body. The programme facilitates knowledge transfer and training, building critical mass in areas of strategic importance for Ireland.

SFI Research Centres are large scale Research Centres which have an economic impact for Ireland. SFI Research Centres may be funded at a level of between €1-5 million per year in direct costs. SFI funds up to 70% of the overall Research Centre budget. A minimum of 30% of the budget must be secured from industry partners, at least one-third of which must be in cash.
See details on the 16 funded SFI Research Centres here:

Name	Research	Est.	Website
ADAPT	Centre for Digital Content Technology	2014	https://www.adaptcentre.ie
AMBER	Advanced Materials and Bio-engineering Research	2013	http://www.ambercentre.ie
APC Microbiome Institute	Microbiome	2013	http://apc.ucc.ie/
BiOrbic	Bioeconomy	2017	https://biorbic.com/
CONFIRM	Smart Manufacturing	2017	https://confirm.ie/
CONNECT	Centre for Future Networks and Communications	2014	http://www.connectcentre.ie
CÚRAM	Centre for Research in Medical Devices	2014	http://www.curamdevices.ie
FutureNeuro	Neurological Diseases	2017	http://www.futureneurocentre.ie
iCRAG	Irish Centre for Research in Applied Geosciences	2014	http://www.icrag-centre.org
I-Form	Advanced Manufacturing	2017	http://www.i-form.ie/
Insight	Data Analytics	2013	http://www.insight-centre.org
IPIC	Irish Photonic Integration Centre	2013	http://www.ipic.ie
Lero	The Irish Software Research Centre	2014	http://www.lero.ie
MaREI	Marine and Renewable Energy Ireland	2013	http://www.marei.ie
SSPC	Pharmaceuticals	2013	http://sspc.ie/
Vistamilk	Dairy Production Chain	2017	http://vistamilk.ie/

SFI Research Centre Spokes is a mechanism to allow new industry and academic partners to join the existing SFI Research Centres.

SFI Partnership Programme is a mechanism by which SFI builds collaborations with industry, funding agencies, charities, philanthropic organisations or higher education institutes (HEIs) in order to co-fund future opportunities.

SFI Centre for Research Training is a mechanism to fund cohorts of research students.

Name	Research Training in	Est.	Website
ML-Labs	Machine Learning	2019	https://www.ml-labs.ie
FUSE	Foundations of Data Science	2019	https://www.data-science.ie
CRT-AI	Artificial Intelligence	2019	http://crt-ai.cs.ucc.ie
DREAL	Digitally Enhanced Reality	2019	https://d-real.ie
Genomics	Genomics Data Science	2019	https://genomicsdatascience.ie
ADVANCE	Advanced Networks for Sustainable Societies	2019	https://www.advance-crt.ie

=== Other ===
SFI Research Infrastructure Call funds the research community in building and sustaining the required infrastructural capacity to accomplish research in areas of science, technology, engineering and mathematics. SFI supports the use, renewal and development of existing national research infrastructures and invests in modern research equipment and infrastructure in areas of national priority.

SFI Fellowship Programme is a career development programme that allows candidates to participate in the activities carried out by a funding agency in order to gain new experience.

SFI Conference and Workshop programme funds international and national conferences and workshops hosted in Ireland. These events are for the dissemination of research, knowledge exchange, development and exposure of early career researchers and students and development and growth of new and existing collaborations both nationally and internationally. SFI will support conferences and workshops of timely importance in all areas covered by SFI's legal remit. SFI Conference and Workshop Awards fall into four different categories: Conference, Exceptional Conference, Workshop and Conference Bid.

SFI Award for Journalism Relating to Science and Technology is an annual award issued by the National Student Media Awards (Smedias) and funded by SFI. The Smedias are run by the Oxygen.ie website.

Technology Innovation Development Award (TIDA) is a joint funded initiative by SFI and Enterprise Ireland (EI). The TIDA programme enables researchers to focus on the first steps of an applied research project that has a commercial benefit if further developed.

=== SFI St. Patrick's Day Medal ===
Every year Science Foundation Ireland celebrates the achievements of Irish Scientists, engineers and business leaders living and working in the USA. The agency awards two Medals - one for industry and one for academia. Both Medals recognise individuals who are not only outstanding in their fields of expertise but who also have demonstrably assisted researchers in Ireland in either academia or industry - via mentorship, supervision, collaboration, industrial development, entrepreneurship or who have made significant contributions to developing the research ecosystem in Ireland.

Past medal recipients are:

Year	Academic Medal	Industry Medal
2025	Prof Richard Kearney, Boston College	Mr Michael Dowling, President and CEO of Northwell Health
2024	Dr Eamonn Keogh, University of California, Riverside	Mr John Hartnett, CEO of SVG Ventures|THRIVE
2023	Prof Paul K Whelton, Tulane University	Mr Paul Daugherty, Group Chief Executive - Technology and CTO, Accenture
2022	Prof Donald McDonnell, Duke University	Patrick and John Collison, Stripe Founders
2021	Prof William C Campbell, Drew University	Mr Vincent T Roche, President and CEO, Analog Devices, Inc. (ADI)
2020	Prof Neville Hogan, Massachusetts Institute of Technology	Dr Ann Kelleher, Technology Development Lead, Intel Corporation
2019	Prof Eamon Quigley, Houston Methodist Hospital	Mr Mike Mahoney, CEO Boston Scientific
2018	Prof Margaret Murnane, University of Colorado at Boulder	Mr David McCourt, Founder and CEO, Granahan McCourt Capital
2017	Prof Adrian Raftery, University of Washington	Dr T. Pearse Lyons, Founder and President of Alltech
2016	Prof Séamus Davis, Cornell University	Dr Craig Barrett, ex Intel
2015	Prof Katherine Fitzgerald, University of Massachusetts	
2014	Prof Garret A. FitzGerald, University of Pennsylvania	

== Public Engagement, Education and Outreach ==
SFI Discover is the education and public engagement programme of Science Foundation Ireland and covers three main areas of activity:

1. Directly managed programmes (listed below)
2. Projects and activity completed through the SFI Research Centres and other researchers funded through SFI
3. Projects funded through the SFI Discover annual funding call.

=== Science Week ===
Science Week is an annual nationwide promotion of science to the general public, first starting in 1996. It consists of a week-long programme of events across Ireland each November to make science more interesting and accessible to children and adults alike.

Organised events take place in schools, colleges, universities, libraries, companies and other public places and are run by volunteers. The national media and promotional campaign is coordinated by SFI's Discover Programme with over 800 events taking place throughout the country.

The Science Week website is the information platform for events. Organisers submit their event details online to a searchable events database and participants upload images and videos of events they have attended.

=== SFI Curious Minds ===
The SFI Curious Minds Programme supports schools in delivering the science and maths curriculum in schools and to make it more interesting, relevant and visual for their students. It facilitates teacher training in general primary science, and provides teachers with online resources – which can also be used by parents and students – and classroom activity packs.

Major elements for the programme include:

- "Continued Professional Development" for all staff of participating schools
- Awards for 'Science and Maths Excellence', to reward primary schools for carrying out science, technology, engineering and maths activities both in the school and externally.
- A network of over 50 Discover Centres with accredited workshops and outreach programmes for primary school students on a range of themes encompassing STEM

=== Discover Funding Call ===
Science Foundation Ireland, through the SFI Discover Programme promotes awareness and engagement of the Irish public with science, technology, engineering and maths (STEM). The SFI Discover Programme was set up to catalyse, inspire and guide STEM education and public engagement. To achieve this the programme Call funds the development of STEM education and public engagement sector in Ireland, investing in developing and extending activity and ability in this area, and exploring and encouraging novel means of engaging the public.

=== Science in Ireland Barometer ===
The study was commissioned by SFI and most recently completed by Qualia Analytics (in 2020–21) to establish the Irish public's attitudes and awareness of STEM in our society, as well as the impact of the COVID-19 pandemic on public attitudes and behaviours. An earlier version of this survey was conducted in 2015. The 2015 study was involved face-to-face interviews, across a nationally representative sample of 1,008 adults aged 15+ in Ireland. The study found that awareness of science is generally positive. Science was deemed to be highly valued both for economic growth and personal prosperity but only half the population felt adequately informed. The public seek clarity and consistency in what they hear about science, with positive engagement of science teachers and parents being key factors to children's interest in STEM.

== See also ==
- Open access in the Republic of Ireland
- Government Chief Scientific Advisor
