= Pacific Western University - California =

Pacific Western University - California (PWU) was an unaccredited, private, distance learning university based in Los Angeles, California. Founded in 1976, it offered bachelor's, master's, and doctoral degree programs in business, education, science, social sciences, and related fields through independent-study.

The university awarded academic credit for professional experience, previous study, and other forms of prior learning, including life experience. Students completed degree requirements through essay questions, and dissertations rather than classroom instruction and examinations. Degrees were offered by correspondence and later through electronic communication.

Throughout its history, PWU operated under California's regulatory framework for private postsecondary institutions. It was authorized - and after 1996 approved - to confer degrees but it was never accredited. Its educational model, degree requirements, and academic standards were the subject of criticism from journalists, employers, government agencies, and educational authorities. Credits earned at PWU were generally not transferable to accredited universities, and its degrees were often not recognized by professional organizations, governments or corporations.

in the late 1980s PWU expanded through separately incorporated operations in Hawaii and Louisiana. Following regulatory actions involving these new Pacific Western institutions and increased scrutiny of unaccredited universities during the early 2000s, PWU - California was sold to new owners in 2005. It was subsequently renamed and reorganized as California Miramar University, while the original Pacific Western University - California ceased operations in 2007.

== Institutional model ==
=== Distance-learning approach ===
Pacific Western University - California offered independent study programs leading to bachelor, masters and doctoral degrees in a variety of business, science, social science, education and helping professions. PWU - California degrees were offered through the mail and later using email. Instead of charging by course, Pacific Western University charged a flat rate for each degree. The school recruited potential students using advertisements in newspapers (and later online) offering degrees with credit for life and work experience.

=== Degree requirements ===
The university programs had no residency requirements, classes or examinations. Instead, according to a PWU - California spokesperson in 1982, "the bulk of our credits are given for life and work experience". Students submitted a portfolio of their past study and work experience and were then awarded academic credit by PWU. Following this evaluation, a program was set up to make up the difference between this experience and what was required to fulfill PWU's degree requirements.

To receive their degree, students were required to complete essay questions and a dissertation. A bachelor's degree required a paper about 7-15 pages in length, a Master's was slightly longer at 9-15 pages while doctoral dissertation was of about 50-75 pages. This doctoral students could be a book or project analysis. According to the university's 1982 brochure "no departmental committee will supervise the progress of the dissertation" and there were no oral defenses.

=== Degree length ===
Students completed the programs very quickly, often in less than a year: Frank Sutter, PWU's vice president stated in 1989 that all programs could be completed "within nine months". In the 1980s, completing a master's was described as taking about 5-6 months., while a doctorate took between 6-12 months. In the 1990s, degrees still required less than than a year of studies, with about 6-12 months for undergraduate degree.

== History ==
=== Founding and early operation ===
Pacific Western University was incorporated in November 1976 in Los Angeles, California. It was authorized to offer degrees by the California Bureau for Private Postsecondary and Vocational Education in February 1977. At this time, Californian law allowed three types of degree-granting universities: accredited, approved and authorized schools. Accredited and approved universities were closely scrutinized by the state. Authorized schools, such as PWU, were only required to prove that they had sufficient financial assets, and to disclose to students that they were not accredited but were not subject to the same oversight as accredited and approved universities.

Almost from its inception, PWU - California's programs degrees were criticized by institutions, employers and government officials as lacking in quality and rigor. Employees in US corporations and school districts had their qualifications and salaries questioned when they were found to have qualifications from the unaccredited university. Some claimed it was a diploma mill offering degrees that were "practically worthless". PWU - California denied that it was a diploma mill. PWU vice-president Frank Sutter stated that the university did not sell degrees, stating "[a]ll degrees are earned". "We don't have any classes," Sutter said in 1979. "We don't teach anything. But if somebody can prove to us that they have completed the work or have the experience then we can convert that into academic credit and a degree.... We don't take anybody. We're not trying to create something that isn't there. But we are attempting to recognize people who are eminently qualified for a degree."

=== Regulatory concerns and expansion ===
In 1986, PWU's request to renew its authorized status was evaluated and was granted on a split decision among reviewers due to concerns about overextended faculty mentors. A subsequent review in 1988 noted ongoing concerns about the amount of instruction offered, and in fact found that in some cases, no teaching had been provided. PWU - California was reauthorized but was directed to cease offering doctoral degrees.

In 1990 PWU president Philip Forte wrote to Californian officials that the school had opened universities in Louisiana and Hawaii and began offering doctoral programs from the office in Hawaii. The Hawaiian university was run by the staff at the Los Angeles location. According to Education Services, the official custodian of records for all three Pacific Western Universities, "[e]ach university was separately incorporated and operated under very different state laws. The schools all maintained different administration, curriculum and education standards." The Louisiana organization shuttered in April 1994: the Louisiana Board of Regents closed its office, asserting that it offered too many credits for a thesis, had too few teachers, and not enough courses. Students who chose to could transfer to Pacific Western University-Hawaii.

=== State approved status and ongoing scrutiny ===
Following a change in Californian law requiring universities to be approved, in January 1991 PWU - California was granted candidate status as a California state approved institution. An evaluation in March 1994 by the California Bureau for Private Postsecondary and Vocational Education noted that PWU served an overlooked population, was flexible, and that the admin staff were competent and efficient. However, the evaluation critiqued that as many as 15 credits were awarded for completing the application portfolio, which would typically be considered at college admission form. In addition, PWU was very generous when giving credit for prior learning. In terms of teaching, they noted that frequently no individual course work was completed, and course credit was given automatically. In their view, the theses worth 15 credits were roughly equivalent of a term paper of a single course at a traditional college. PWU - California was subsequently denied renewal of their approval to grant degrees; however a stay was granted pending an appeal. PWU - California was granted the required approved status in 1996.

In April 1999, the Hawaiian Office of Consumer Affairs gave a "stipulated judgment" against linked university PWU - Hawaii, which was required to refund tuition payments of students misled by PWU's assurances about accreditation, and to pay $30,000 for the costs of the investigation. The judgement also required PWU - Hawaii not to make any claims that it was authorized by the State of Hawaii to offer degrees and from using the term accreditation or similar words in a misleading manner. In 2005, PWU - Hawaii faced further legal difficulties:the Office of Consumer Affairs filed a further lawsuit seeking to prevent the organization from engaging in "unfair or deceptive acts or practices", and to void all contracts between PWU - Hawaii and its students. The university fought the lawsuit but eventually ran out of funds. A default judgement was entered against the university on May 9, 2006, and PWU - Hawaii closed.

=== GOA investigation ===
In September 2004, the United States Government Accountability Office issued a report entitled "Diploma Mills" which investigated online universities including Pacific Western University. It was determined that at least 28 senior-level federal employees in eight agencies had college degrees from unaccredited schools including three workers with emergency operations roles and security clearances at the National Nuclear Security Administration, part of the Department of Energy. Federal employees receiving tuition financing are required to pursue degrees at accredited schools. An undercover investigator found that PWU - California was, amongst other schools, willing to change their billing to make it appear like a per-course fee in order to receive federal money. In 2004, an investigative news program from KVOA in Tucson, Arizona followed up on the report by visiting PWU in Los Angeles. They found it was a small office staffed by two receptionists and the dean.

=== Sale ===
In 2005 the assets of Pacific Western University - California, including its valuable California state approval status was sold to new owners. The sale did not include the legally and financially separate assets belonging to the Hawaiian and Louisianan schools. New dean Dominic Mwenja stated that the university was anxious to draw a clear line between the Californian and Hawaii universities due to the past history. Mwenha reported that he had hired completely new and different faculty and he moved the university to San Diego, California. In order to further distance itself from past controversies, the university's name was changed first to California University and then, after the University of California objected, to California Miramar University. PWU - California's students were taught out by CalMU, and then in May 2007 Pacific Western University - California ceased operating completely. CalMU applied for and was subsequently accredited in 2009 by Distance Education and Training Council and Accrediting Council for Independent Colleges and Schools. The accrediting agency ruled that CalMU and PWU - California were separate schools that operated under different academic standards and as a result graduates of Pacific Western University - California are not eligible receive CalMU diplomas.

== Recognition and acceptance ==
Due to its status as an unaccredited institution, courses and credits obtained at PWU - California are not transferable to accredited or approved universities, and its degrees are not recognized by governments and other organizations and institutions in a variety of countries. Employers and institutions do not recognize its qualifications, and the use of its titles are legally restricted or prohibited in certain regions. PWU - California informed their students that their degrees might not be accepted by accredited institutions or by state, federal, or other organizations. PWU - California president Philip Forte stated that students had all been required to sign a document acknowledging that PWU was unaccredited.

==== United States ====
In the US, multiple PWU graduates had their qualifications publicly challenged over the years.

==== Ireland ====
In 2005, Barry McSweeney was forced to resigned from his position as Chief Science Advisor to the Irish government after it was found that his Ph.D. degree was from Pacific Western University (California). McSweeney denied that he purchased a PhD, and that he had obtained it after a year of study. He refused to make his doctoral thesis public.

====== Korea ======
In 2006, more than 30 officials working for the Ministry of Education and an agency associated with the Ministry of Science and Technology were found to have received doctorates from Pacific Western. Businessmen and artists had also received the degrees. Four others were found to be working as college professors. In Korea, registration of foreign degrees is required and it is illegal to register degrees from unaccredited universities. Eight were investigated by police, including 2 college professors. According to the police, none of the degree holders had visited Los Angeles, and many were unable to write their thesis title in English. They had earned their degrees by reading material from the internet and submitting dissertations that usually had been copied from academic texts.

==== China ====
Tan Jun a Microsoft executive had claimed to have had a degree from the prestigious California Institute of Technology but later admitted that his doctorate was from Pacific Western University - California.
