= Minister for Further and Higher Education, Research, Innovation and Science =

Irish government cabinet minister

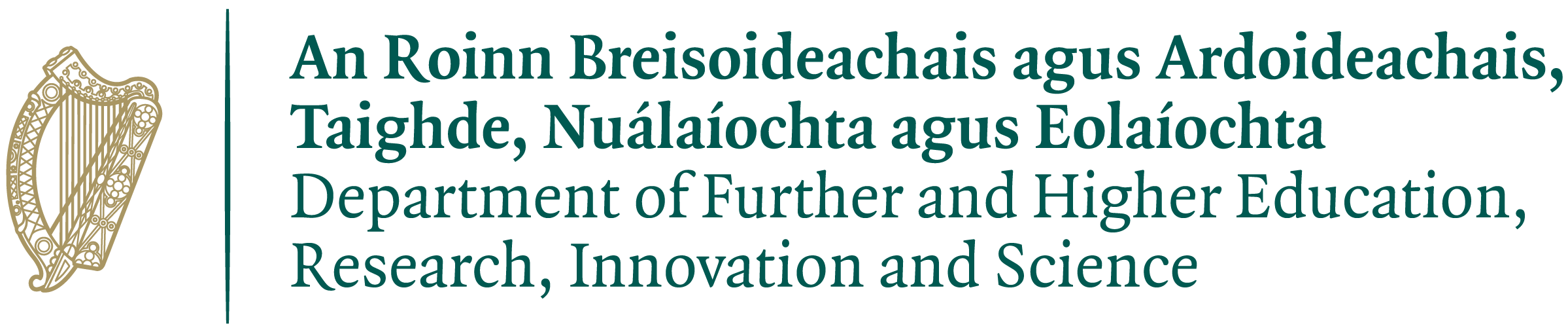

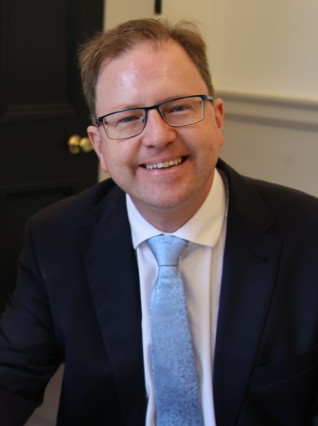
- Incumbent; James Lawless since 23 January 2025
- Department of Further and Higher Education, Research, Innovation and Science
- Type: Education minister; Science minister
- Status: Cabinet minister
- Member of: Government of Ireland; Council of the European Union; Dáil Éireann
- Reports to: Taoiseach
- Seat: Dublin, Ireland
- Nominator: Taoiseach
- Appointer: President of Ireland (on the advice of the Taoiseach)
- Inaugural holder: Simon Harris
- Formation: 2 August 2020
- Salary: €210,750 (2025) (including €115,953 TD salary)
- Website: Official website

The minister for further and higher education, research, innovation and science (Irish: An tAire Breisoideachais agus Ardoideachais, Taighde, Nuálaíochta agus Eolaíochta) is a senior minister in the Government of Ireland and leads the Department of Further and Higher Education, Research, Innovation and Science.

The minister for further and higher education, research, innovation and science is James Lawless, TD.

He is assisted by Marian Harkin, TD, Minister of State for further education, apprenticeships, construction and climate skills.

== List of office-holders ==
=== Minister for Further and Higher Education, Research, Innovation and Science 2020–present ===
Name	Term of office		Party	Government(s)
Simon Harris	27 June 2020 (Note: On 2 August 2020, the Department of Further and Higher Education, Research, Innovation and Science was established on the enactment of the Ministers and Secretaries and Ministerial, Parliamentary, Judicial and Court Offices (Amendment) Act 2020. Harris was a minister without portfolio until the establishment of the department.)	9 April 2024	Fine Gael	32nd • 33rd
Patrick O'Donovan	9 April 2024	23 January 2025	Fine Gael	34th
James Lawless	23 January 2025	Incumbent	Fianna Fáil	35th
