= Tang Jun (politician) =

Chinese politician

Tang Jun (Chinese: 唐军; born May 1962) is a Chinese politician who is currently serving as the Communist Party Secretary of Dalian, a major city in coastal northeastern China.

Tang was born in Jianhu County, Jiangsu province. He has a degree in Chinese literature from Wuhan University. He joined the Chinese Communist Party in January 1986. He worked for most of his career as a functionary in the Ministry of Personnel. In August 2007 he was named Vice Minister of Personnel. In March 2008 he was named Organization Department head of the Liaoning party committee, and a member of the provincial party standing committee.

Tang was named party chief of Dalian on June 27, 2011.
