= Western Pacific =

Western Pacific may refer to:

- Western Pacific Airlines (1994–1998)
- The western Pacific Ocean
- Western Pacific Railroad (1903–1983)
- Western Pacific Railroad (1862–1870)

Western Pacific may also refer to:

- Western Pacific High Commission
- Far East, the western edge of the Pacific Rim
- Naval Forces Western Pacific
- Western Pacific Airservice, see List of airline codes (W)
- World Health Organization, Western Pacific Regional Office

== See also ==
- Northwestern Pacific
