= Marian Harkin =

Irish politician (born 1953)

Marian Harkin TD
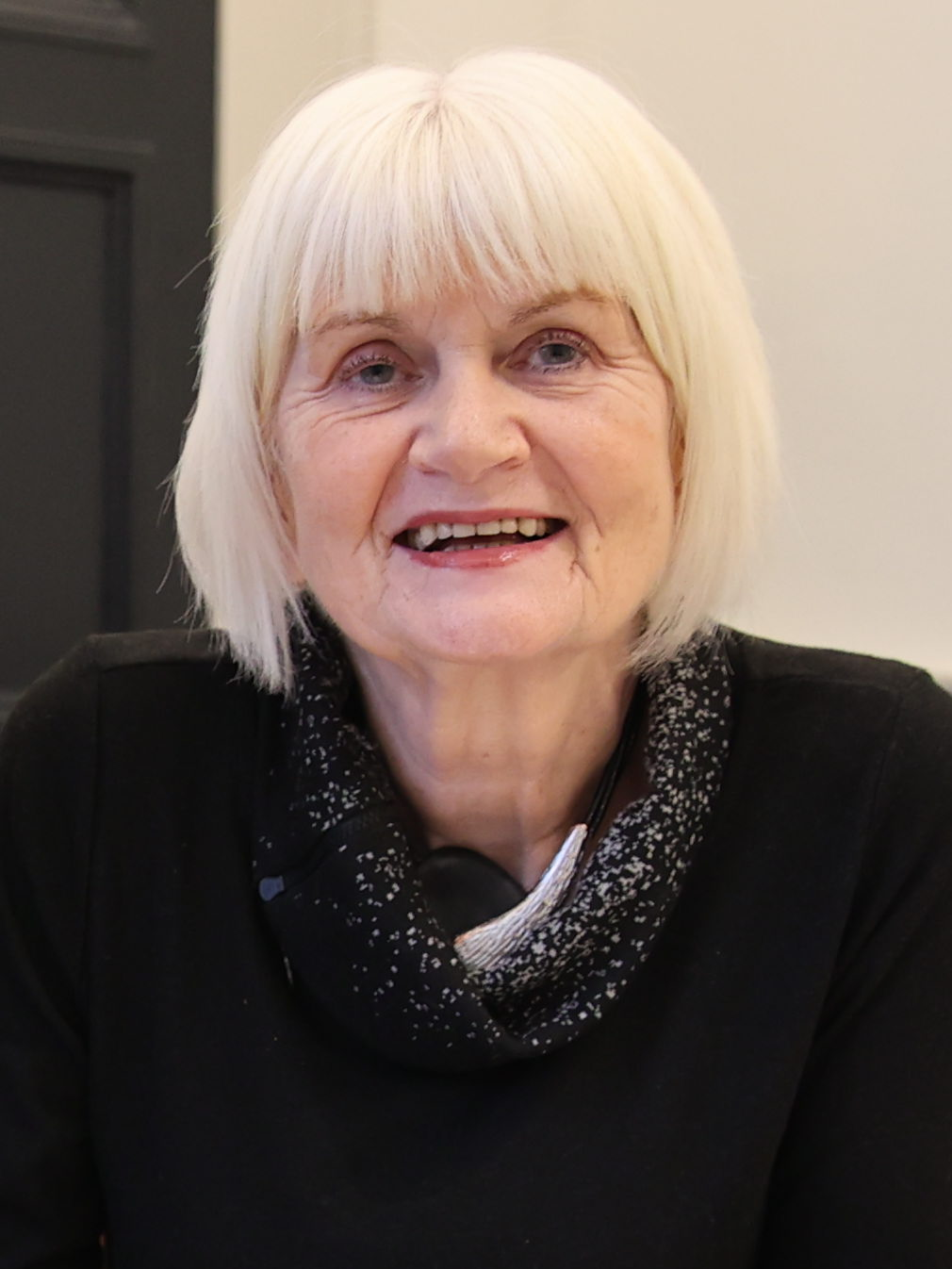
- Harkin in 2024

Minister of State
- 2025–: Further and Higher Education, Research, Innovation and Science

Teachta Dála
- Incumbent
- Assumed office February 2020
- In office May 2002 – May 2007
- Constituency: Sligo–Leitrim

Member of the European Parliament
- In office 1 July 2014 – 24 May 2019
- Constituency: Midlands–North-West
- In office 1 July 2004 – 20 May 2014
- Constituency: North-West

Personal details
- Born: 26 November 1953 (age 72) Ballintogher, County Sligo, Ireland
- Party: Independent
- Other political affiliations: European Democratic Party
- Spouse: Seán Harkin (m. 1985; died 1996)
- Children: 2
- Education: University College Dublin

Marian Harkin (born 26 November 1953) is an Irish independent politician who has served as Minister of State at the Department of Further and Higher Education, Research, Innovation and Science since February 2025. She has been a Teachta Dála (TD) for the Sligo–Leitrim constituency since the 2020 general election, and previously from 2002 to 2007. She previously served as a Member of the European Parliament (MEP) from 2004 to 2019.

== Early and family life ==
Harkin was born in Ballintogher, County Sligo, in 1953. She studied at University College Dublin, where she attained a Bachelor of Science degree in geology. She worked as a maths teacher at Mercy College secondary school in Sligo for 25 years, before entering into politics.

== Community activism ==
While living in Manorhamilton, Harkin became active in the voluntary and community sector and developed the view that people living in disadvantaged areas such as Connacht had to rely on their own initiative and energy to progress development of their region. Her work at local level led to her appointment to Developing the West Together, which evolved into the Council for the West, of which Harkin became chairperson.

== Irish politics ==
She was elected to Dáil Éireann as an Independent TD for the Sligo–Leitrim constituency at the 2002 general election, receiving the highest number of first preference votes in the constituency.

== Member of the European Parliament, 2004–2019 ==
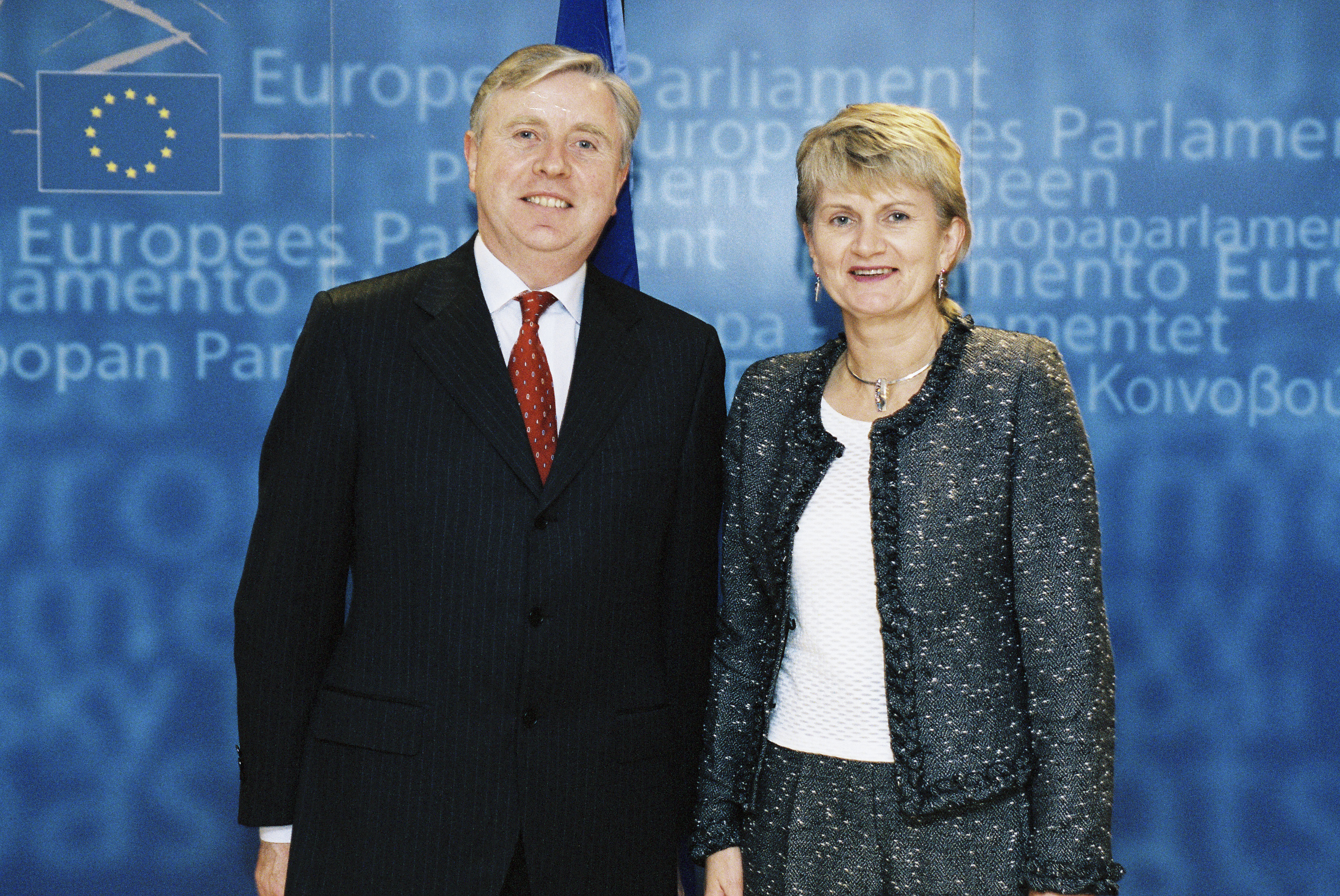
Harkin alongside MEP Pat Cox in 2003

At the 2004 European Parliament election, she was returned as an MEP for the North-West constituency topping the poll and being elected on the fourth count. She had previously contested the 1999 European Parliament election in the same constituency (then called Connacht–Ulster), but had narrowly failed to be elected, losing out to Dana Rosemary Scallon for the third seat in the constituency. However, in 2004, the position was reversed and Harkin was returned at Scallon's expense.

Harkin did not contest the 2007 general election to concentrate on her role as an MEP.

She was a member of the Alliance of Liberals and Democrats for Europe group (ALDE) in the European Parliament. Harkin was a member of the European Parliament's Committee on Employment and Social Affairs and the delegation for relations with the United States. She has been European Democratic Party Vice-president since December 2012. In addition, she served as vice-chairwoman of the European Parliament Intergroup on Integrity (Transparency, Anti-Corruption and Organized Crime). She is also a supporter of the MEP Heart Group, a group of parliamentarians who have an interest in promoting measures that will help reduce the burden of cardiovascular diseases (CVD).

She was re-elected to the European Parliament at the 2009 European Parliament election topping the poll in her constituency. She was again re-elected at the 2014 European Parliament election, taking the fourth seat in the new Midlands–North-West constituency.

On 1 April 2019, she announced that she was not standing for re-election in the 2019 European Parliament election.

== Return to Dáil (2020–present) ==
In January 2020, she announced she was standing in the Sligo–Leitrim constituency at the 2020 general election, where she was elected.

At the 2024 general election, Harkin was re-elected to the Dáil. In February 2025, she was appointed as Minister of State at the Department of Further and Higher Education, Research, Innovation and Science with special responsibility for further education, apprenticeship, construction and climate skills.

In September 2025, Harkin declared her support for Maria Steen's candidacy in the 2025 Irish presidential election.

Political offices
Preceded by Niall Collins	Minister of State at the Department of Further and Higher Education, Research, Innovation and Science; 2025–present	Incumbent

Dáil	Election	Deputy (Party)	Deputy (Party)	Deputy (Party)	Deputy (Party)	Deputy (Party)
13th	1948	Eugene Gilbride (FF)	Stephen Flynn (FF)	Bernard Maguire (Ind.)	Mary Reynolds (FG)	Joseph Roddy (FG)
14th	1951	Eugene Gilbride (FF)	Stephen Flynn (FF)	Patrick Rogers (FG)	Mary Reynolds (FG)	Joseph Roddy (FG)
15th	1954	Eugene Gilbride (FF)	Stephen Flynn (FF)	Bernard Maguire (Ind.)	Mary Reynolds (FG)	Joseph Roddy (FG)
16th	1957	Eugene Gilbride (FF)	Stephen Flynn (FF)	John Joe McGirl (SF)	Mary Reynolds (FG)	Patrick Rogers (FG)
16th	1961 by-election	Eugene Gilbride (FF)	Joseph McLoughlin (FG)	John Joe McGirl (SF)	Mary Reynolds (FG)	Patrick Rogers (FG)
17th	1961	Eugene Gilbride (FF)	Joseph McLoughlin (FG)	James Gallagher (FF)	Eugene Gilhawley (FG)	4 seats 1961–1969
18th	1965	Eugene Gilbride (FF)	Joseph McLoughlin (FG)	James Gallagher (FF)	Eugene Gilhawley (FG)	4 seats 1961–1969
19th	1969	Ray MacSharry (FF)	Joseph McLoughlin (FG)	James Gallagher (FF)	3 seats 1969–1981	
20th	1973	Ray MacSharry (FF)	Joseph McLoughlin (FG)	Eugene Gilhawley (FG)	3 seats 1969–1981	
21st	1977	Ray MacSharry (FF)	James Gallagher (FF)	Eugene Gilhawley (FG)	3 seats 1969–1981	
22nd	1981	Ray MacSharry (FF)	John Ellis (FF)	Joe McCartin (FG)	Ted Nealon (FG)	4 seats 1981–2007
23rd	1982 (Feb)	Ray MacSharry (FF)	John Ellis (FF)	Matt Brennan (FF)	Ted Nealon (FG)	4 seats 1981–2007
24th	1982 (Nov)	Ray MacSharry (FF)	Joe McCartin (FG)	Matt Brennan (FF)	Ted Nealon (FG)	4 seats 1981–2007
25th	1987	Ray MacSharry (FF)	John Ellis (FF)	Matt Brennan (FF)	Ted Nealon (FG)	4 seats 1981–2007
26th	1989	Gerry Reynolds (FG)	John Ellis (FF)	Matt Brennan (FF)	Ted Nealon (FG)	4 seats 1981–2007
27th	1992	Declan Bree (Lab)	John Ellis (FF)	Matt Brennan (FF)	Ted Nealon (FG)	4 seats 1981–2007
28th	1997	Gerry Reynolds (FG)	John Ellis (FF)	Matt Brennan (FF)	John Perry (FG)	4 seats 1981–2007
29th	2002	Marian Harkin (Ind.)	John Ellis (FF)	Jimmy Devins (FF)	John Perry (FG)	4 seats 1981–2007
30th	2007	Constituency abolished. See Sligo–North Leitrim and Roscommon–South Leitrim				

Dáil	Election	Deputy (Party)	Deputy (Party)	Deputy (Party)	Deputy (Party)
32nd	2016	Martin Kenny (SF)	Marc MacSharry (FF)	Eamon Scanlon (FF)	Tony McLoughlin (FG)
33rd	2020	Martin Kenny (SF)	Marc MacSharry (FF)	Marian Harkin (Ind.)	Frank Feighan (FG)
34th	2024	Martin Kenny (SF)	Eamon Scanlon (FF)	Marian Harkin (Ind.)	Frank Feighan (FG)
