= Tang Jun (executive) =

Tang Jun (simplified Chinese: 唐骏; traditional Chinese: 唐駿; pinyin: Táng Jùn) is a Chinese business executive. He is the president of Gaotime Information Co. Ltd, a consulting firm for financial institutions and large companies within China.

== Biography ==
Prior to Gaotime, he was the president and CEO of Xin Hua Du Industrial Group Co., a group company incorporated in the PRC with interests in retail, real estate, mining, high-tech and tourism industries. Shortly before joining Xin Hua Du Industrial Group Co., Mr. Tang served as the president and director of Shanda Interactive Entrainment Limited, a company listed in NASDAQ. Now he still remains a member of Shanda's board of directors and serves as an advisor to the CEO of Shanda. Prior to joining Shanda in 2004, Tang served as the president of Microsoft China Co., Ltd. from March 2002 to January 2004 and the general manager of Microsoft Asia product support and service and Microsoft Global Technical Engineering Center from January 1998 to March 2002. He received the Microsoft chairman Bill Gates Award in 1998 and the Microsoft Top Honor Award in 2002 from Microsoft Corporation, and remains the honorary president of Microsoft China Co. Ltd. Prior to joining Microsoft, Tang founded a software company, in Los Angeles, California in 1993.

Jun Tang has been a non-executive director of Tsingtao Brewery Co., Ltd. since November 2009.

In accordance with the Registration Statement of Shanda Interactive Entertainment Ltd in NASDAQ, Tang holds a doctorate degree in electrical engineering from Pacific Western University (Hawaii), a master's degree in electronics from Nagoya University and a bachelor's degree in physics from Beijing University of Posts and Telecommunications.

== Controversy ==
In 2010, Tang Jun became the focus of public controversy over his resume. In the first edition of his book My Success is Replicable, Tang claimed to hold a doctoral degree in computer science from California Institute of Technology (Caltech). However, Fang Zhouzi checked Caltech's alumni list and lists of doctoral dissertations, and found no records for Tang. Tang stated that he did not have a degree from Caltech, and that he had never claimed to have received a degree there, but had conducted research there. Fang asked Tang to provide information about the kind of research and the names of professors at Caltech Tang had worked with. So far, Tang has not provided any relevant information. It raises the question whether Tang has ever conducted any research at Caltech. Furthermore, Fang has also pointed out that Pacific Western University (Hawaii) was named in the United States Government General Accounting Office report to the United States Congress. On July 8, 2010, the publisher of Tang's book My Success is Replicable made an official announcement to clarify and apologize for the mistake. According to the publisher, due to communication insufficiency, they failed to find the mistake and correct it in time. On the second edition of the book, they made the correction.
