= California Miramar University =

University in California, United States

Coordinates: 32.779216°N 117.118052°W

- Seal of California Miramar University
- Motto: Scientia Potentia Est
- Motto in English: "Knowledge is Power"
- Type: Private for-profit university
- Founder: Stanley Foster
- Accreditation: Distance Education Accrediting Commission
- President: Samarth Jain
- Location: San Diego (main campus); additional locations in La Puente (residential campus), San Jose and online, California, United States
- Campus: Urban
- Colors: Gold, dark blue and green
- Mascot: Fighting Falcons
- Website: www.calmu.edu

California Miramar University (CalMU) is a private for-profit university in San Diego, California. The university offers degree programs through distance education and a combination of online and classroom (hybrid) delivery. It is accredited by the Distance Education Accrediting Commission.

== History ==
The California Post-Secondary Education Commission and California Miramar University list CalMU's date of establishment as 2005. According to California Miramar University's website, CalMU purchased the assets of Pacific Western University - California, including its State of California approval status, in late 2005. As part of the asset sale, an institutions transition plan was implemented that called for PWU (California) to relocate to San Diego and teach out all active students over 18 months.

In early 2007, the conditions of the asset transition were complete and the California State Approval was officially transferred to CalMU. At that time Pacific Western University (California) ceased operations. Later that year California Miramar University filed for accreditation. As part of the accreditation process, the accrediting agency ruled that CalMU and PWU California were separate schools that operated under separate academic standards. The accreditation agencies stipulated that graduates of Pacific Western University - California would not be eligible to receive CalMU diplomas or transcripts and that the records of the two schools should be held separate. To comply with accreditation requirements, CalMU transferred copies of all PWU – California institutional and student records to Education Services, which serves as the official custodian of records for all PWU students.

== Academics ==
California Miramar University has two schools, the School of Business and the School of Technology. The School of Business offers degrees from the undergraduate level to the doctorate level in business administration. The School of Technology offers a Master of Science in Computer Information Systems and a Master of Science in Artificial Intelligence.

The university is accredited by the Distance Education Accrediting Commission. It is also approved under the California Private Postsecondary Education Act of 2009, section 94890 by the California Bureau of Private Postsecondary Education (BPPE).

== See also ==
- List of colleges and universities in California
