= Economy of the Republic of Ireland =

Economy of Ireland
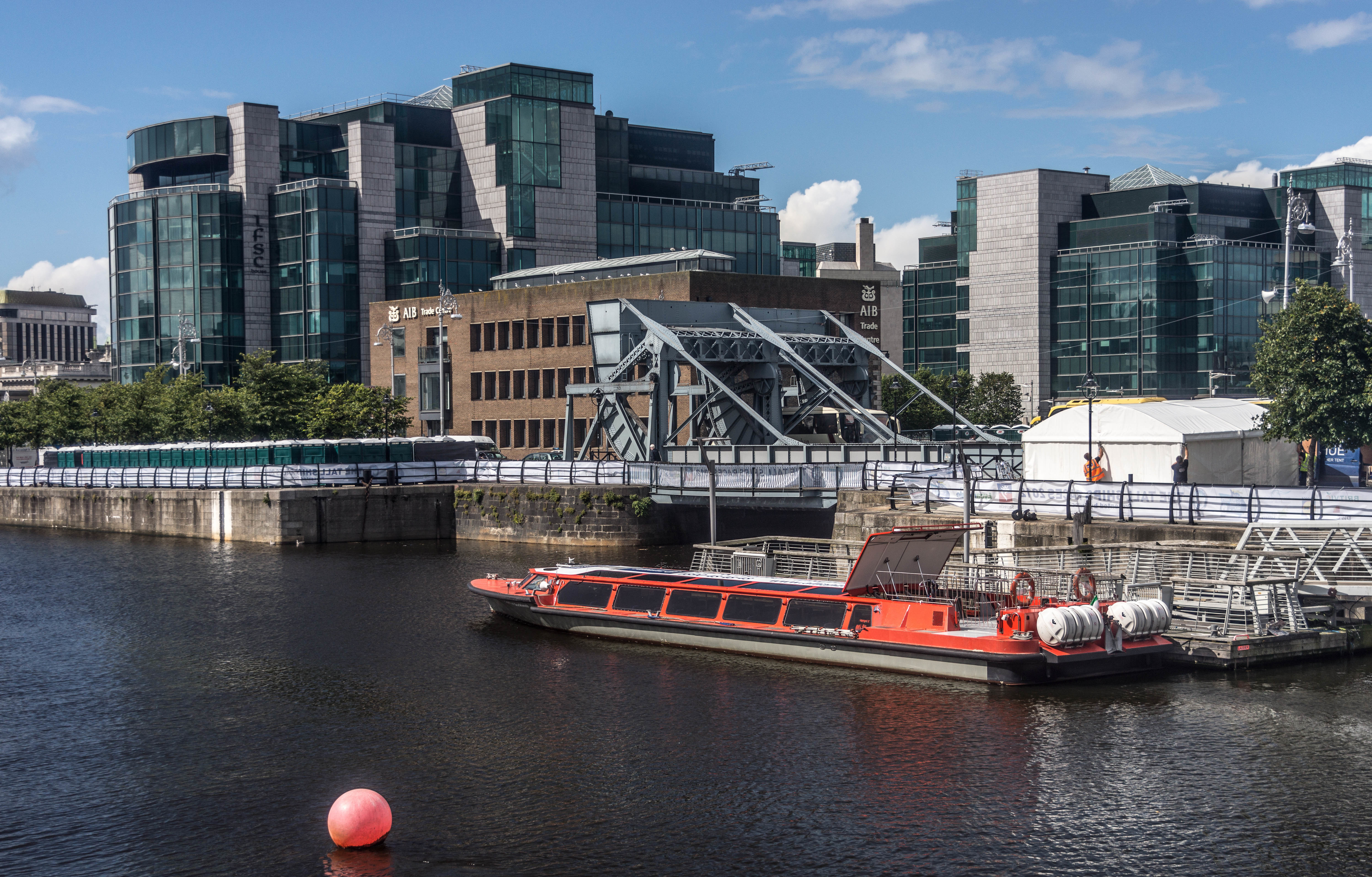
- The International Financial Services Centre in Dublin
- Currency: Euro (EUR, €)
- Fiscal year: Calendar year
- Trade organisations: EU, WTO and OECD
- Country group: Advanced economy; High-income economy

Statistics
- Population: ▲5,149,139 (2022 census)
- GDP: ▲$587.220 billion (nominal; 2025); ▲$720.310 billion (PPP; 2025)
- GDP rank: 25th (nominal; 2024); 41st (PPP; 2024)
- GDP growth: ▼ -5.5% (2023); ▼ -0.2% (2024f); ▲2.3% (2025f)
- GDP per capita: ▲$107,243 (nominal; 2025); ▲$133,550 (PPP; 2025)
- GDP per capita rank: 3rd (nominal; 2025); 3rd (PPP; 2024)
- GDP by sector: Agriculture: 0.9%; Industry: 37.6%; Services: 56.6%; (2023 est.)
- Inflation (CPI): 8.1% (2022); 5.2% (2023); 1.7% (2024f)
- Population below national poverty line: ▼6.7% (consistent poverty in 2017); Poverty line in 2022: €13,400/year; ▼19.2% at risk of poverty or social exclusion (AROPE, 2023)
- Gini coefficient: ▲27.4 low (2023, Eurostat)
- Human Development Index: ▲0.950 very high (2022) (7th); ▼0.886 very high IHDI (6th) (2022)
- Corruption Perceptions Index: 77 out of 100 points (2023) (11th)
- Labour force: ▲2,690,000 (2023); ▲77.5% employment rate (2023)
- Labour force by occupation: Agriculture: 5%; Industry: 11%; Services: 84%; (2015 est.)
- Unemployment: ▲4.2% (October 2024)
- Youth unemployment: ▲11.7% (2025)
- Average gross salary: €4,002 monthly (2023-Q1)
- Average net salary: €3,086 monthly (2023-Q1)
- Main industries: Pharmaceuticals; chemicals; computer hardware; software; food products; beverages and brewing; medical devices

External
- Exports: ▲ Goods – €208.208 billion (2022); ▲ Services – €337.282 billion (2022)
- Export goods: Chemicals and related products 64.24%; Machinery and transport equipment 13.17%; Miscellaneous manufactured articles 10.18%; Food and live animals 7.11%; Manufactured goods classified chiefly by material 1.57%; Crude materials, inedible, except fuels 1.05%; Beverages and tobacco 0.98%; Mineral fuels, lubricants and related materials 0.86%; Animal and vegetable oils, fats and waxes 0.07%; (2022)
- Main export partners: European Union ▲38.73%; United States ▼30.27%; Germany ▲12.11%; Belgium ▼8.45%; United Kingdom (excluding Northern Ireland) ▼8.25%; Netherlands ▲6.83%; China ▼6.62%; France ▲3.44%; Italy ▼2.18%; (2022)
- Imports: ▲ Goods - €140.199 billion (2022); ▲ Services - €354.051 billion (2022)
- Import goods: Machinery and transport equipment 35.76%; Chemicals and related products 27.38%; Miscellaneous manufactured articles 10.53%; Mineral fuels, lubricants and related materials 9.36%; Food and live animals 6.67%; Manufactured goods classified chiefly by material 6.4%; Beverages and tobacco 0.83%; Crude materials, inedible, except fuels 0.81%; Animal and vegetable oils, fats and waxes 0.41%; (2022)
- Main import partners: European Union ▼30.28%; United Kingdom (excluding Northern Ireland) ▲17.15%; United States ▼15.49%; China ▲10.37%; France ▼8.69%; Germany ▲7.44%; Switzerland ▼4.57%; Netherlands ▼3.39%; Japan ▲2.26%; (2022)
- FDI stock: ▲€1.32 trillion (Q4 2022); ▲ Abroad: €1.11 trillion (Q4 2022)
- Current account: ▼$17 billion (2022 est.)
- Gross external debt: ▲€2.954 trillion (June 2022)
- Net international investment position: ▼ −€610 billion (July 2022)

Public finance
- Government debt: ▼44.7% of GDP (2022); ▼€224.8 billion (2022)
- Foreign reserves: ▼$12.905 billion (2023 est.)
- Budget balance: €8.0 billion surplus (2022); +1.6% of GDP (2022)
- Revenue: ▲€115.506 billion; 22.98% of GDP (2022)
- Spending: ▲€107.473 billion; 21.38% of GDP (2022)
- Economic aid: €900 million from European Structural and Investment Funds (2007–2013); €3.36 billion from European Structural and Investment Funds (2014–2020)
- Credit rating: Standard & Poor's: A+ (Domestic); A+ (Foreign); AAA* (T&C Assessment); Outlook: Stable; Moody's: A2; Outlook: Stable; Fitch: AA-; Outlook: Stable; Scope: AA; Outlook: Stable
- All values, unless otherwise stated, are in US dollars.

Ireland has a highly developed knowledge economy, focused on services in high-tech, life sciences, financial services and agribusiness, including agrifood. Ireland is an open economy (3rd on the Index of Economic Freedom), and ranks first for high-value foreign direct investment (FDI) flows. In the global GDP per capita tables, Ireland ranks 2nd of 192 in the IMF table and 4th of 187 in the World Bank ranking.

Social expenditure stood at roughly 13.4% of GDP in 2024. Following a period of continuous growth at an annual level from 1984 to 2007, the post-2008 Irish economic downturn severely affected the economy, compounding domestic economic problems related to the collapse of the Irish property bubble. Ireland first experienced a short technical recession from Q2-Q3 2007, followed by a recession from Q1 2008 – Q4 2009.

After a year with stagnant economic activity in 2010, the Irish real GDP rose by 2.2% in 2011 and 0.2% in 2012. This growth was mainly driven by improvements in the export sector. The European sovereign-debt crisis caused a new Irish recession to start in Q3 2012, which was still ongoing as of Q2 2013. By mid-2013, the European Commission's economic forecast for Ireland predicted its growth rates would return to a positive 1.1% in 2013 and 2.2% in 2014. An inflated 2015 GDP growth of 26.3% (GNP growth of 18.7%) was officially partially ascribed to tax inversion practices by multinationals switching domiciles. This growth in GDP, dubbed "leprechaun economics" by American economist Paul Krugman, was shown to be driven by Apple Inc.'s restructuring of its Irish subsidiary in January 2015. The distortion of Ireland's economic statistics (including GNI, GNP and GDP) by the tax practices of some multinationals, led the Central Bank of Ireland to propose an alternative measure (modified GNI or GNI*) to more accurately reflect the true state of the economy from that year onwards.

Foreign-owned multinationals continue to contribute significantly to Ireland's economy, making up 14 of the top 20 Irish firms (by turnover), employing 23% of the private sector labour-force, and paying 80% of the collected corporation tax.

== Economic contributors and measures ==
Foreign-owned multinationals make up a significant percentage of Ireland's GDP. The "multinational tax schemes" used by some of these multinational firms contribute to a distortion in Ireland's economic statistics; including GNI, GNP and GDP. For example, the Organisation for Economic Co-operation and Development (OECD) shows Ireland with average leverage on a gross public debt-to-GDP basis (78.8% in 2016), but with the second highest leverage (after Japan) on a gross public debt-per capita basis ($62,686 in 2016). This disconnect led to the 2017 development by the Central Bank of Ireland of Irish modified GNI (or GNI*) for measuring the Irish economy (2016 GDP is 143% of Irish 2016 GNI*, and OECD Irish gross public debt-to-GNI* is 116.5%). Ireland's GNI* per capita ranks it similar to Germany. According to an OECD report, productivity growth among foreign owned entities averaged 10.9% for 2017 and was a lower 2.5% for indigenous firms.

The distortion of Irish economic data by US multinational tax schemes was a key contributor to the build-up of leverage in the Celtic Tiger, amplifying both Irish consumer optimism (who borrowed to 190% of disposable income, OECD highest), and global capital markets optimism about Ireland (enabled Irish banks to lend over 180% of deposit base, OECD highest). Global capital markets, who ignored Ireland's private sector credit, and OECD/IMF warnings, when Irish GDP was rising during the Celtic Tiger, retracted during the post-2008 Irish economic downturn, leading to a deep decline in Irish property values.

A particularly dramatic growth in Ireland's 2015 GDP (from 1% in 2013, to 8% in 2014, to 25% in 2015) was shown to be largely driven by Apple restructuring their double Irish subsidiary, ASI, in January 2015. A follow-up EU Commission report into Ireland's national accounts showed that even before this, 23% of Ireland's GDP was multinational net royalty payments, implying Irish GDP was inflated to 130% of "true" GDP (before the Apple growth). This led to the Central Bank of Ireland proposing a new replacement metric, modified gross national income (or GNI*), to better represent the "true" Irish economy.

Given the importance of US multinationals to Ireland's economy (80% of Irish multinational employment, and 14 of the 20 largest Irish firms), the passing of the Tax Cuts and Jobs Act of 2017 is a challenge to Ireland. Parts of the US TCJA are targeted at Irish multinational tax schemes, especially the move to a modern "territorial tax" system, the introduction of a lower FDII tax on intellectual property, and the counter-Irish GILTI tax regime. Additionally, the EU's proposed Digital Sales Tax and stated desire for a Common Consolidated Corporate Tax Base, is also seen as an attempt to restrict the use of the Irish multinational tax schemes by US technology firms.

The stabilisation of the Irish credit bubble required a large transfer of debt from the private sector balance sheet (highest OECD leverage), to the public sector balance sheet (almost unleveraged, pre-crisis), via Irish bank bailouts and public deficit spending. The transfer of this debt means that Ireland, in 2017, had one of the highest levels of both public sector indebtedness, and private sector indebtedness, in the EU-28/OECD.

== History ==
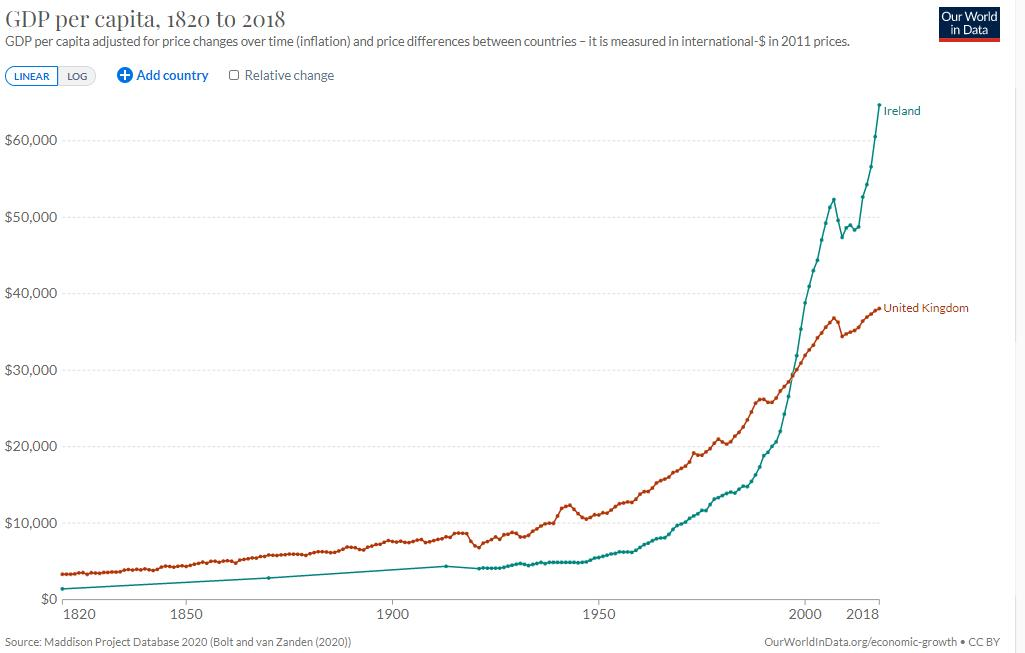
Historical GDP per capita development of Ireland and the UK

=== Since the Irish Free State ===
From the 1920s, Ireland had high trade barriers such as high tariffs, particularly during the Economic War with Britain in the 1930s, and a policy of import substitution. During the 1950s, 400,000 people emigrated from Ireland. It became increasingly clear that economic nationalism was unsustainable. While other European countries enjoyed fast growth, Ireland suffered economic stagnation. The policy changes were drawn together in Economic Development, an official paper by T. K. Whitaker published in 1958 that advocated free trade, foreign investment, and growth rather than fiscal restraint as the prime objective of economic management.

In the 1970s, the population increased by 15% and national income increased at an annual rate of about 4%. Employment increased by around 1% per year, but the state sector amounted to a large part of that. Public sector employment was a third of the total workforce by 1980. Budget deficits and public debt increased, leading to the crisis in the 1980s. During the 1980s, underlying economic problems became pronounced. Middle income workers were taxed 60% of their marginal income, unemployment had risen to 20%, annual overseas emigration reached over 1% of population, and public deficits reached 15% of GDP.

In 1987, Fianna Fáil reduced public spending, cut taxes, and promoted competition. Ryanair used Ireland's deregulated aviation market and helped European regulators to see benefits of competition in transport markets. Intel invested in 1989 and was followed by a number of technology companies such as Microsoft and Google. A consensus exists among all government parties about the sustained economic growth.

Between 1985 and 2002, private sector jobs increased 59%. The economy shifted from an agriculture to a knowledge economy, focusing on services and high-tech industries. Economic growth averaged 10% from 1995 to 2000, and 7% from 2001 to 2004. Industry, which accounts for 46% of GDP and about 80% of exports, has replaced agriculture as the country's leading sector.

=== Celtic Tiger (1995–2007) ===
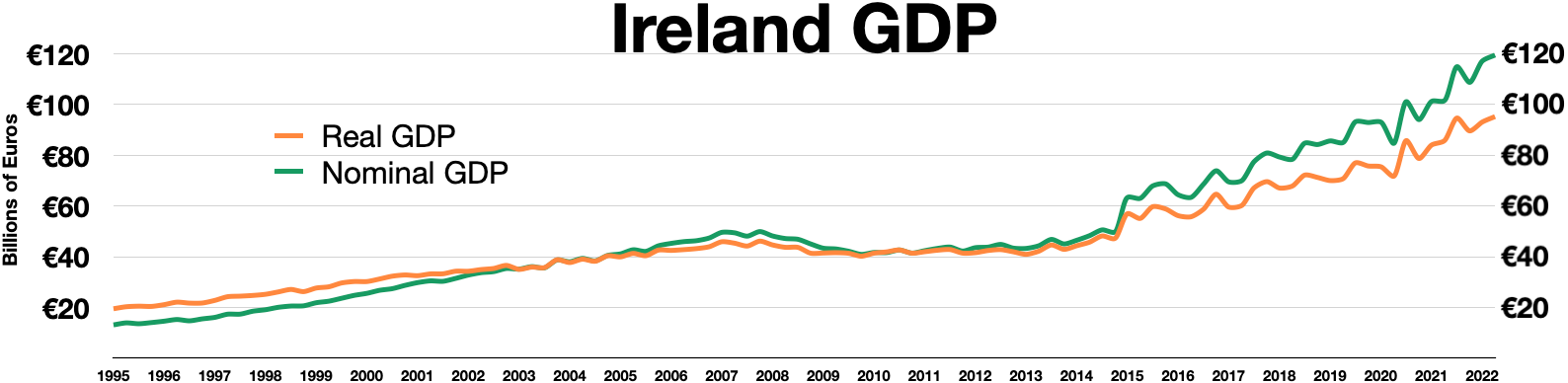
Ireland GDP Real GDP (chained 2010 Euros) Nominal GDP

Historian R. F. Foster argues the cause was a combination of a new sense of initiative and the entry of American corporations such as Intel. He concludes the chief factors were low taxation, pro-business regulatory policies, and a young, tech-savvy workforce. For many multinationals the decision to do business in Ireland was made easier still by generous incentives from the Industrial Development Authority. In addition European Union membership was helpful, giving the country lucrative access to markets that it had previously reached only through the United Kingdom, and pumping huge subsidies and investment capital into the Irish economy.

The economy benefited from a rise in consumer spending, construction, and business investment. Since 1987, a key part of economic policy has been Social Partnership, which is a neo-corporatist set of voluntary 'pay pacts' between the Government, employers and trade unions. The 1995 to 2000 period of high economic growth was called the Celtic Tiger, a reference to the tiger economies of East Asia.

GDP growth continued to be relatively robust, with a rate of about 6% in 2001, over 4% in 2004, and 4.7% in 2005. With high growth came high inflation. Prices in Dublin were considerably higher than elsewhere in the country, especially in the property market. However, property prices were falling following the economic recession. At the end of July 2008, the annual rate of inflation was at 4.4% (as measured by the CPI) or 3.6% (as measured by the HICP) and inflation actually dropped slightly from the previous month.

A 2008 study reported that in terms of GDP per capita, Ireland is ranked as one of the wealthiest countries in the OECD and the EU-27, at 4th in the OECD-28 rankings. However, in terms of GNP per capita, a better measure of national income, Ireland ranks below the OECD average, despite significant growth in recent years, at 10th in the OECD-28 rankings. GDP is significantly greater than GNP (national income) due to the large number of multinational firms based in Ireland. A 2005 study by The Economist found Ireland to have the best quality of life in the world.

The positive reports and economic statistics masked several underlying imbalances. The construction sector, which was inherently cyclical in nature, accounted for a significant component of Ireland's GDP. A recent downturn in residential property market sentiment has highlighted the over-exposure of the Irish economy to construction, which now presents a threat to economic growth. Despite several successive years of economic growth and significant improvements since 2000, Ireland's population is marginally more at risk of poverty than the EU-15 average and 6.8% of the population suffer "consistent poverty".

=== Economic downturn (2008–2013) ===
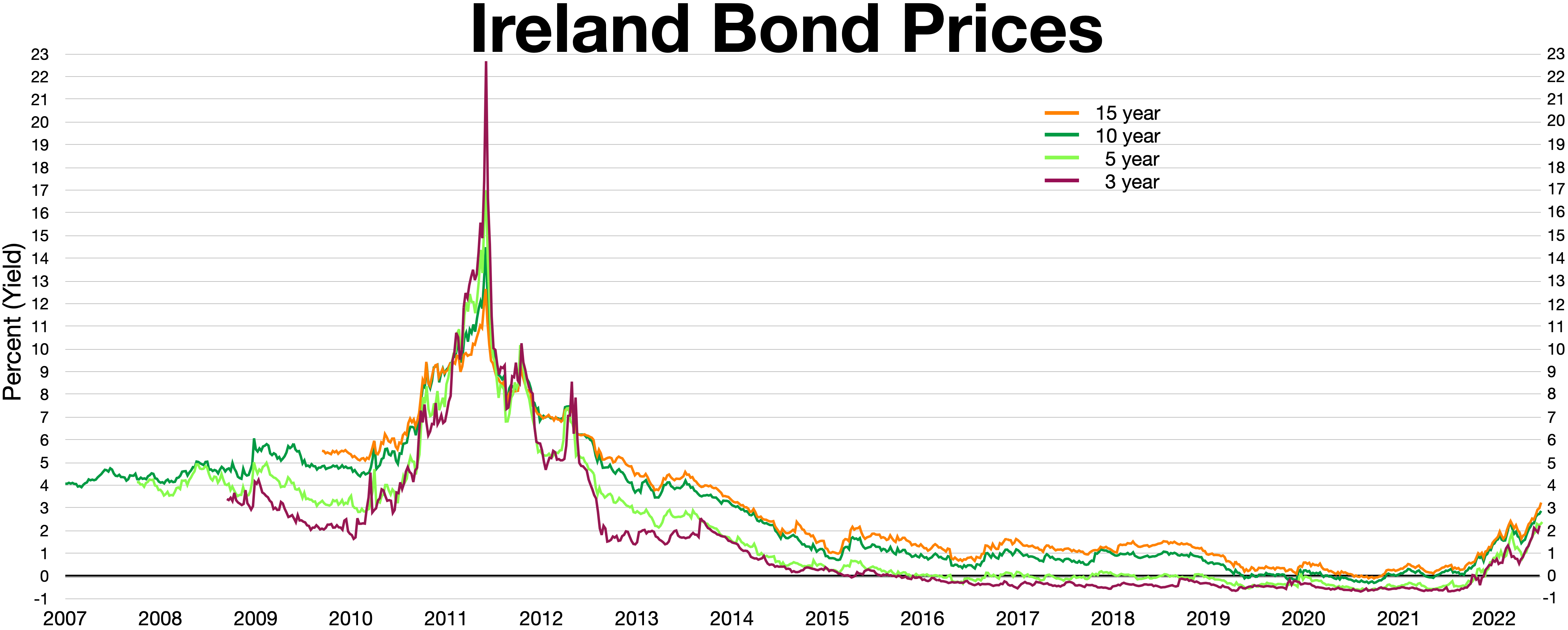
Ireland bond prices, Inverted yield curve in 2011 15 year bond 10 year bond 5 year bond 3 year bond

It was the first country in the EU to officially enter a recession related after the 2008 financial crisis, per the Central Statistics Office. At this point, Ireland now had the second-highest level of household debt in the world (190% of household income). The country's credit rating was downgraded to "AA−" by Standard & Poor's ratings agency in August 2010 due to the cost of supporting the banks, which would weaken the Government's financial flexibility over the medium term. It transpired that the cost of recapitalising the banks was greater than expected at that time, and, in response to the mounting costs, the country's credit rating was again downgraded by Standard & Poor's to "A".

The global recession has significantly impacted the Irish economy. Economic growth was 4.7% in 2007, but −1.7% in 2008 and −7.1% in 2009. In mid-2010, Ireland looked like it was about to exit recession following growth of 0.3% in Q4 of 2009 and 2.7% in Q1 of 2010. The government forecast a 0.3% expansion. However the economy experienced Q2 negative growth of −1.2%, and in the fourth quarter, the GDP shrunk by 1.6%. Overall, the GDP was reduced by 1% in 2010, making it the third consecutive year of negative growth. On the other hand, Ireland recorded the biggest month-on-month rise for industrial production across the eurozone in 2010, with 7.9% growth in September compared to August, followed by Estonia (3.6%) and Denmark (2.7%).

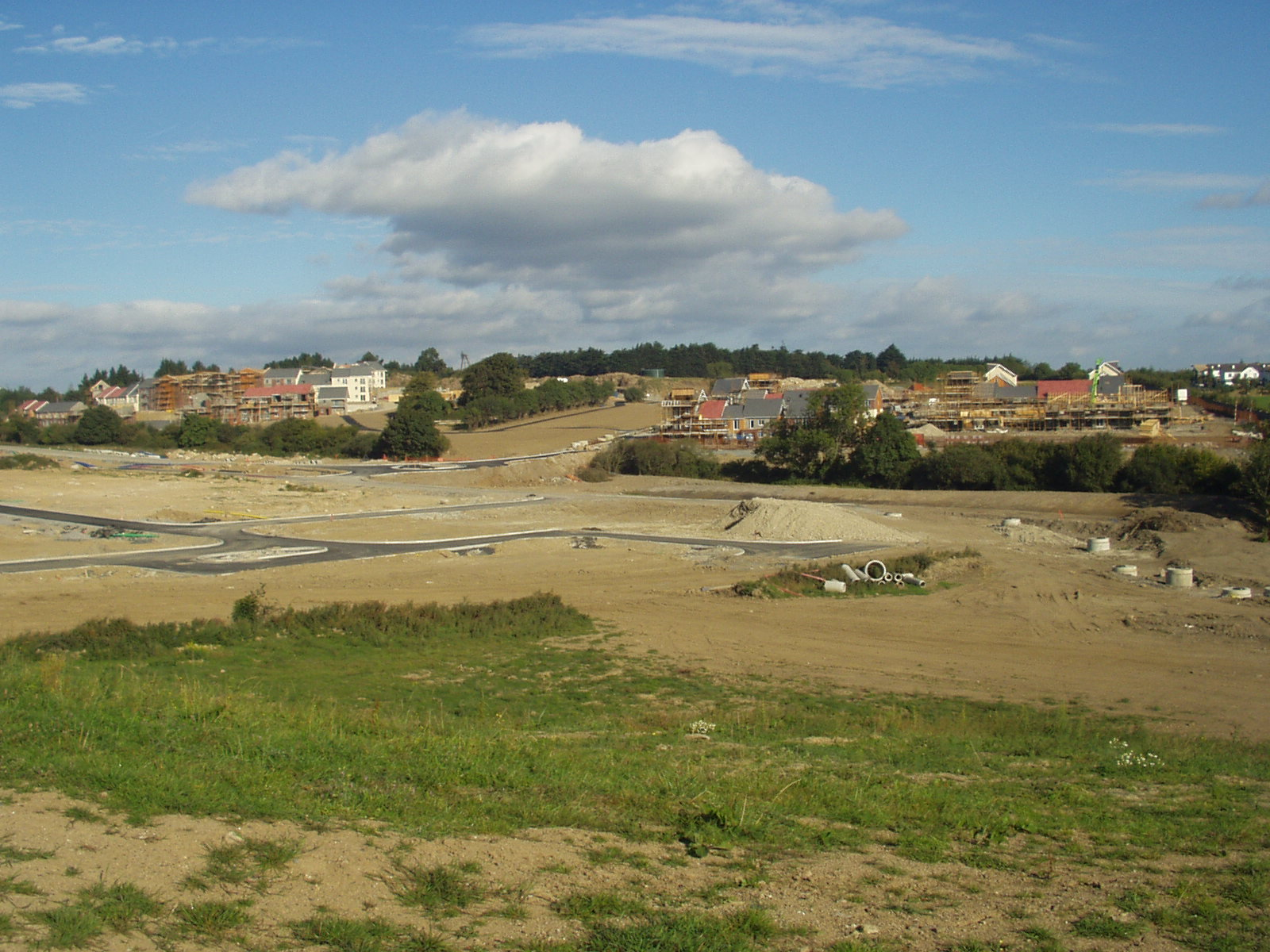
A housing construction site in Dublin at Sandyford, 2006

The second problem, unacknowledged by management of Irish banks, the financial regulator and the Irish government, is solvency. The question concerning solvency had arisen due to domestic problems in the Irish property market. Irish financial institutions had substantial exposure to property developers in their loan portfolio. In 2008, property developers had an over-supply of property, with much unsold as demand significantly diminished. The employment growth of the past that attracted many immigrants from Eastern Europe and propped up demand for property was replaced by rising unemployment.

Irish property developers speculated billions of Euros in overvalued land parcels such as urban brownfield and greenfield sites. They also speculated in agricultural land which, in 2007, had an average value of €23,600 per acre ($32,000 per acre or €60,000 per hectare) which is several multiples above the value of equivalent land in other European countries. Lending to builders and developers has grown to such an extent that it equals 28% of all bank lending, or "the approximate value of all public deposits with retail banks. Effectively, the Irish banking system has taken all its shareholders' equity, with a substantial chunk of its depositors' cash on top, and handed it over to builders and property speculators.....By comparison, just before the Japanese bubble burst in late 1989, construction and property development had grown to a little over 25 per cent of bank lending."

Irish banks correctly identify a systematic risk of triggering an even more severe financial crisis in Ireland if they were to call in the loans as they fall due. The loans are subject to terms and conditions, referred to as "covenants". These covenants are being waived in fear of provoking the (inevitable) bankruptcy of many property developers and banks are thought to be "lending some developers further cash to pay their interest bills, which means that they are not classified as 'bad debts' by the banks". Furthermore, the banks' "impairment" (bad debt) provisions are still at very low levels. This does not appear to be consistent with the real negative changes taking place in property market fundamentals.

On 30 September 2008, the Irish Government declared a guarantee that intends to safeguard the Irish banking system. The Irish National guarantee, backed by taxpayer funds, covers "all deposits (retail, commercial, institutional and interbank), covered bonds, senior debt and dated subordinated debt". In exchange for the bailout, the government did not take preferred equity stakes in the banks (which dilute shareholder value) nor did they demand that top banking executives' salaries and bonuses be capped, or that board members be replaced.

Despite the government guarantees to the banks, their shareholder value continued to decline and in 2009, the government nationalised Anglo Irish Bank, which had a market capitalisation of less than 2% of its peak in 2007. Subsequent to this, further pressure came on the other two large Irish banks, who on 2009-01-19, had share values fall by between 47 and 50% in one day. As of 11 October 2008, leaked reports of possible actions by the government to artificially prop up the property developers have been revealed.

In contrast, on 7 October 2008, Danske Bank wrote off a substantial sum largely due to property-related losses incurred by its Irish subsidiary – National Irish Bank. The 3.18% charge against the loan book of its Irish operations is the first significant write off to take place and is a modest indication of the extent of the more substantial future charges to be incurred by the over-exposed domestic banks. Asset write-downs by the domestically-owned Irish banks are only now slowly beginning to take place

In November 2010, the Irish government published a National Recovery plan, which aimed to restore order to the public finances and to bring its deficit in line with the EU target of 3% of economic output by 2015. The plan envisaged a budget adjustment of €15 billion (€10 billion in public expenditure cuts and €5 billion in taxes) over a four-year period. This was front-loaded in 2011, when measures totalling €6 billion took place. Subsequent budgetary adjustments of €3 billion per year were put in place up to 2015, to reduce the government deficit to less than 3% of GDP. VAT would increase to 23% by 2014. A property tax was re-introduced in 2012. This was initially charged in 2012 as a flat rate on all properties and subsequently charged at a level of 0.18% of the estimated market-value of a property from 2013. Domestic water charges are to be introduced in 2015. Expenditure cuts included reductions in public sector pay levels, reductions in the number of public sector employees through early retirement schemes, reduced social welfare payments and reduced health spending. As a result of increased taxation and decreased government spending the Central Statistics Office (Ireland) reported that the Irish government deficit had decreased from 32.5% of GDP in 2010 (a level boosted by one-off support payments to the financial sector) to 5.7% of GDP in 2013. In addition Ireland's unemployment rate fell from a peak of 15.1% in February 2012 to 10.6% in December 2014. The number of people in employment increased by 58,000 (3.1% increase in employment rate) in the year to September 2013. On 27 February 2014 the government launched its Action Plan for Jobs 2014, which followed similar plans initiated in 2013 and 2012.

=== Signs of recovery (2014–2016) ===
The term "Celtic Phoenix" was coined by journalist and satirist Paul Howard, which has been occasionally used by some economic commentators and media outlets to describe the indicators of economic growth in some sectors in Ireland since 2014.

In late 2013, Ireland exited an EU/ECB/IMF bailout. The Irish economy began to recover in 2014, growing by 4.8%, making Ireland the fastest growing economy in the European Union. Contributing factors to growth included a recovering construction sector, quantitative easing, a weak euro, and low oil prices. This growth helped to reduce national debt to 109% of GDP, and the budget deficit fell to 3.1% in the fourth quarter.

The headline unemployment rate remained steady at 10%, though the youth unemployment rate remained higher than the EU average, at over 20%. Emigration had continued to play a significant factor in unemployment statistics, though the emigration rate also began to fall in 2014.

Property prices also increased in 2014, growing fastest in Dublin. This was due to a housing shortage, especially in the Dublin area. The demand for housing caused some recovery in the Irish construction and property sectors. By early 2015, house price increases nationally began to outpace those in Dublin. Cork saw house prices rise by 7.2%, while Galway prices rose by 6.8%. Prices in Limerick were 6.7% higher while in Waterford there was a 4.9% increase. The housing crisis resulted in over 20,000 applicants being on the social housing list in the Dublin City Council area for the first time. In May 2015, the Insolvency Service of Ireland reported to the Oireachtas Justice Committee that 110,000 mortgages were in arrears, and 37,000 of those are in arrears of over 720 days.

On 14 October 2014, Minister for Finance Michael Noonan and Minister for Public Expenditure and Reform Brendan Howlin introduced the budget for 2015, the first in seven years to include tax cuts and spending increases. The budget reversed some of the austerity measures that had been introduced over the previous six years, with increased spending and tax cuts worth just over €1bn.

In April 2015, during a "Spring Economic Statement", Noonan and Howlin outlined the government's plans and projections up to the year 2020. This included policy statements on expansionary budgets, deficit management plans and proposed cuts to the Universal Social Charge and other taxes.

In October 2014, German finance minister, Wolfgang Schäuble said that Germany was "jealous" at how the Irish economy had recovered after its bailout. He also said that Ireland had made a significant contribution to the stabilisation of the euro. While Taoiseach Enda Kenny praised the economic growth, and said that Ireland would seek to avoid returning to a "boom and bust" cycle, he noted that other areas of the economy remained fragile. The European Commission also acknowledged the recovery and growth, but warned that any extra government revenue should be used to further reduce the national debt.

Some other commentators have suggested that, depending on the Eurozone, world economic outlook as well as other internal and external factors, the growth seen in Ireland in 2014 and early 2015 may not indicate a longer-term pattern for sustainable economic improvement. Other commentators have noted that recovery figures do not account for emigration, youth unemployment, child poverty, homelessness and other factors.

On 23 June 2016, the United Kingdom voted to leave the European Union, which was widely reported as likely having a negative impact on trade between the UK and Ireland, and the Irish economy in general. Other commentators, for example the Financial Times, suggested that some London-based financial institutions might move operations to Dublin after Brexit.

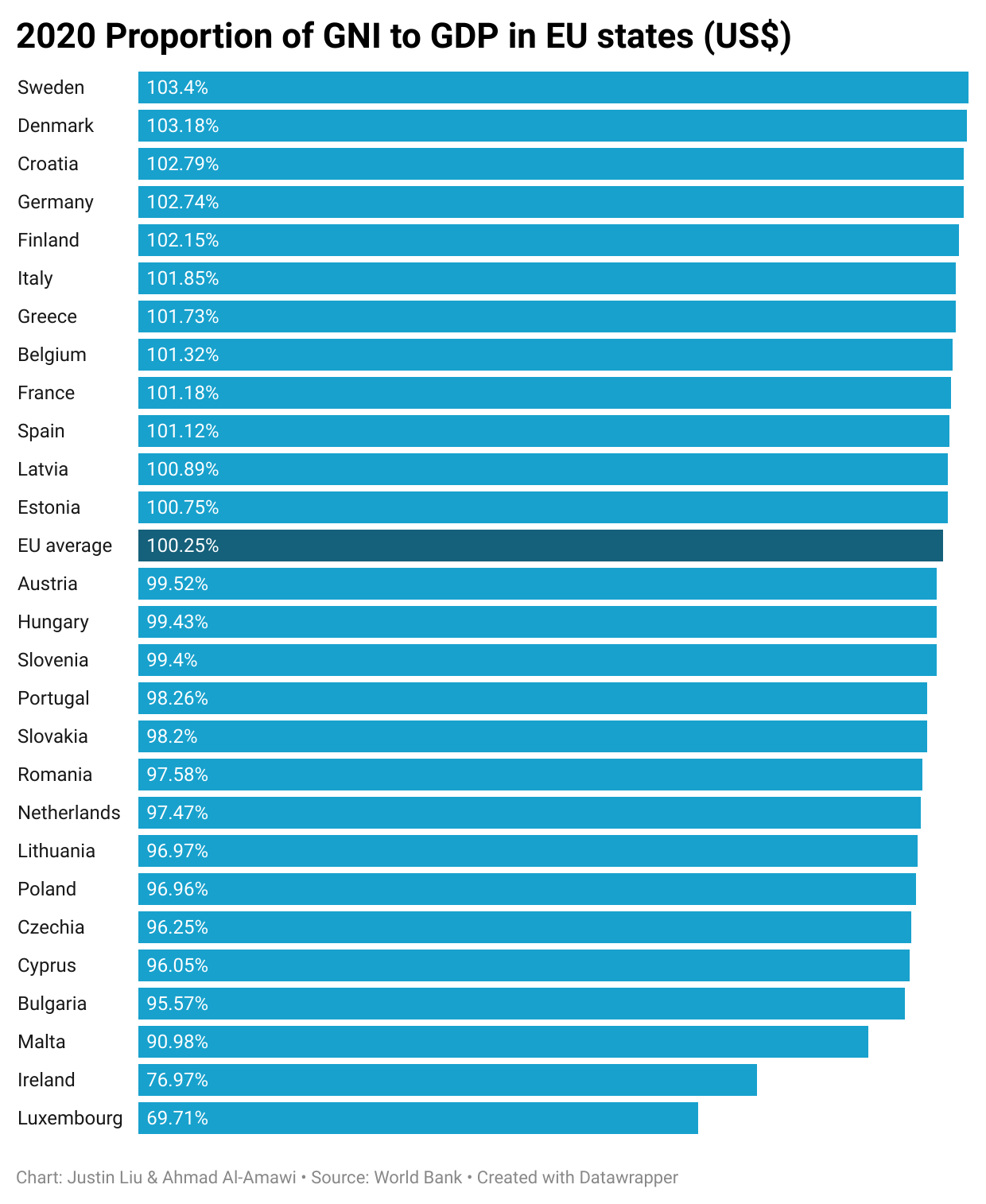
Ireland has one of the most disparate GNI to GDP ratios in the EU.

In 2016 official CSO figures indicated that the economic recovery had led to 26.3% growth in GDP in 2015 and 18.7% growth in GNP. The figures were widely ridiculed including by Nobel Prize winning economist Paul Krugman who labelled them "leprechaun economics". The official explanation was that the closure of the "double Irish" scheme at end 2014 (phased out by 2020), led some multinationals to relocate "intangible assets" to Ireland. It was subsequently shown in 2018 that it was due to Apple's January 2015 restructuring of their "double Irish" structure, Apple Sales International ("ASI"). While the markets had always taken Irish economic statistics with a degree of caution (given the increasing gap between Irish GNI and Irish GDP/GNP), the size of this increase drew attention to the level of distortion US "multinational tax schemes" (like "double Irish") were having on Ireland's statistics. For example, on a "per capita" basis, Ireland is one of the most leveraged economies in the OECD, while on a "% of GDP" basis, it is rapidly de-leveraging.

In response to this, the Central Bank of Ireland created a special steering group, the result of which was a new metric, "Modified gross national income" or "Irish GNI*", for Irish economic analysis. For 2016, Irish GNI* would be 30% below Irish GDP, while Irish Government Net Debt/GNI* would be 106% (vs. Irish Net Debt/GDP of 73%). Commentators who had been tracking the widening gap between Irish GNI and Irish GDP/GNP since the growth of the "double Irish" in the mid-2000s (see tables), and the even stronger effect of the "capital allowances for intangible assets" scheme on distorting GNI/GNP/GDP, noted that GNI* still materially over-stated the true Irish economy. By 2017, a number of Irish financial commentators bemoaned the inaccuracy of Irish economic GDP/GNP statistics.

=== Challenge to low tax model (2017 onwards) ===
During the Irish economic crisis, specific Irish tax schemes were loosened to attract foreign capital to re-balance Ireland's debt. Schemes that were low-tax became almost zero-tax ("capital allowances for intangible assets" in 2009). Schemes that were restricted became more available (i.e. "Section 110 SPVs" in 2012). These schemes attracted the foreign capital that led Ireland's post-crisis recovery. It also saw Ireland rise up the league tables of corporate "tax havens" and be blacklisted by Brazil. A major 2017 study into "offshore financial centers" identified Ireland as a top 5 global Conduit OFC.

This made Ireland the most popular destination for US corporate tax inversions. When Pfizer and Irish-based Allergan announced the largest corporate tax inversion in history at $160bn (84% of Ireland's 2016 GNI* of €190bn), it forced the Obama administration to block US tax inversions. None have occurred since.

Ireland had also become a base for US technology multinationals. By 2014 (see table), Apple's Irish ASI subsidiary was handling €34bn annually of untaxed profits (20% of Ireland's 2014 GNI*). The EU forced Ireland to close the "double Irish", but it was replaced by Apple's "capital allowances" and Microsoft's "single malt".

By 2017, IDA Ireland estimated multinationals (US comprise 80%), contributed €28.3bn in cash to the Irish Exchequer (corporate taxes, wages, and capital spend), and were responsible for an even larger Irish economic impact than could be accurately measured (i.e. new office construction, second order services etc.). The OECD estimated that foreign multinationals provide 80% of domestic value-add and 47% of employment in Irish Manufacturing, and 40% of domestic value-add and 28% of employment in Irish Services. In addition, the OECD estimate that foreign multinationals employ one quarter of the Irish private sector workforce.

However, the US and the EU became more resolute to curb what they saw as excessive tax avoidance by US multinationals in Ireland. A 2018 study published via the Center for International Relations suggested that due to the tax practices of US corporations, Ireland's pattern of trade was more aligned with NAFTA countries than with EU countries.

The US Tax Cuts and Jobs Act of 2017 was passed with Ireland directly in mind. The TCJA moves the US from the "worldwide tax" system (which is the reason why US multinationals use Ireland) to a modern "territorial tax" system (which is the reason why non-US multinationals hardly use Ireland - there are no non-US/non-UK foreign firms in Ireland's top 50 firms by turnover, and only one by employees - German retailer Lidl). The FDII tax regime gives US-based "intellectual property" ("IP") a low-tax 13.125% rate. The GILTI tax regime places a penalty on foreign-based IP (i.e. like in Ireland) that brings its effective rate above the FDII rate (i.e. incentivizes re-location of IP to the US). Experts believe that the TCJA neutralises Ireland's "multinational tax schemes".

The EU Commission's impending 2018 "digital tax" is also designed to curb the Irish "multinational tax schemes". By taxing turnover, it acts as an "override" on the Irish "multinational tax schemes". It has been described by Seamus Coffey, Chairperson of the Irish Fiscal Advisory Council as "a more serious threat to Ireland than Brexit".

== Data ==
The following table shows the main economic indicators in 1980–2021 (with IMF staff estimates in 2022–2027). Inflation under 5% is in green.

Year	GDP (in Bil. US$PPP)	GDP per capita (in US$ PPP)	GDP (in Bil. US$nominal)	GDP per capita (in US$ nominal)	GDP growth (real)	Inflation rate (in Percent)	Unemployment (in Percent)	Government debt (in % of GDP)
1980	25.3	7,390.3	21.4	6,252.2	▲2.9%	▲18.3%	n/a	n/a
1981	▲28.4	▲8,190.6	▼20.4	▼5,886.4	▲2.5%	▲20.2%	n/a	n/a
1982	▲30.6	▲8,733.9	▲21.3	▲6,078.1	▲1.5%	▲17.2%	n/a	n/a
1983	▲31.6	▲8,948.0	▼20.6	▼5,839.8	▼-0.7%	▲10.4%	n/a	n/a
1984	▲33.8	▲9,500.2	▼19.9	▼5,591.8	▲3.2%	▲8.6%	n/a	n/a
1985	▲35.5	▲9,960.4	▲21.2	▲5,934.5	▲1.9%	▲5.5%	17.7%	n/a
1986	▲36.4	▲10,202.3	▲28.5	▲7,993.2	▲0.4%	▲3.0%	▲18.1%	n/a
1987	▲38.7	▲10,817.3	▲33.7	▲9,419.5	▲3.6%	▲3.2%	▲18.8%	n/a
1988	▲41.2	▲11,586.1	▲36.9	▲10,365.3	▲3.0%	▲2.2%	▼18.4%	n/a
1989	▲45.2	▲12,793.2	▲38.0	▲10,754.6	▲5.6%	▲4.0%	▼17.9%	n/a
1990	▲50.6	▲14,310.4	▲48.2	▲13,644.8	▲7.7%	▲3.4%	▼17.2%	n/a
1991	▲53.1	▲14,952.4	▲48.8	▲13,748.2	▲1.6%	▲3.1%	▲19.0%	n/a
1992	▲56.3	▲15,712.2	▲54.9	▲15,331.9	▲3.6%	▲3.2%	▼16.3%	n/a
1993	▲58.9	▲16,366.5	▼51.4	▼14,262.8	▲2.3%	▲1.4%	▲16.7%	n/a
1994	▲63.7	▲17,643.1	▲55.8	▲15,455.4	▲5.9%	▲2.4%	▼15.1%	n/a
1995	▲71.3	▲19,656.6	▲69.3	▲19,086.8	▲9.6%	▲2.5%	▼14.1%	78.5%
1996	▲79.2	▲21,687.0	▲75.9	▲20,781.4	▲9.1%	▲2.2%	▼11.8%	▼69.8%
1997	▲89.3	▲24,177.2	▲83.0	▲22,468.6	▲10.7%	▲1.3%	▼9.9%	▼61.6%
1998	▲98.2	▲26,314.1	▲90.3	▲24,202.5	▲8.8%	▲2.1%	▼7.6%	▼51.4%
1999	▲110.1	▲29,164.8	▲99.0	▲26,233.7	▲10.5%	▲2.4%	▼5.9%	▼46.6%
2000	▲123.1	▲32,161.6	▲100.3	▼26,186.3	▲9.4%	▲5.3%	▼4.4%	▼36.4%
2001	▲132.6	▲34,095.8	▲109.3	▲28,120.1	▲5.3%	▲4.0%	▼4.2%	▼33.6%
2002	▲142.6	▲36,043.1	▲128.5	▲32,482.1	▲5.9%	▲4.7%	▲4.7%	▼30.9%
2003	▲149.8	▲37,249.8	▲164.6	▲40,940.1	▲3.0%	▲4.0%	▲4.9%	▼29.8%
2004	▲164.3	▲40,064.2	▲194.3	▲47,389.3	▲6.8%	▲2.3%	▼4.8%	▼28.1%
2005	▲179.1	▲42,650.8	▲212.0	▲50,476.5	▲5.7%	▲2.2%	▼4.6%	▼26.1%
2006	▲193.9	▲44,867.9	▲232.2	▲53,738.8	▲5.0%	▲2.7%	▲4.8%	▼23.6%
2007	▲209.7	▲47,173.0	▲270.1	▲60,770.1	▲5.3%	▲2.9%	▲5.0%	▲23.9%
2008	▼204.1	▼45,200.0	▲275.4	▲60,990.0	▼-4.5%	▲3.1%	▲6.8%	▲42.5%
2009	▼195.0	▼42,875.5	▼236.2	▼51,943.5	▼-5.1%	▲-1.7%	▲12.6%	▲61.8%
2010	▲200.6	▲43,918.7	▼222.1	▼48,620.6	▲1.7%	▲-1.6%	▲14.6%	▲86.2%
2011	▲206.5	▲45,040.6	▲239.0	▲52,122.1	▲0.8%	▲1.2%	▲15.4%	▲110.5%
2012	▲213.4	▲46,335.2	▼225.8	▼49,029.3	▼0.0%	▲1.9%	▲15.5%	▲119.6%
2013	▲221.2	▲47,773.4	▲238.3	▲51,472.1	▲1.1%	▲0.5%	▼13.8%	▲120.0%
2014	▲238.2	▲51,032.0	▲259.2	▲55,542.0	▲8.6%	▲0.3%	▼11.9%	▼104.3%
2015	▲324.9	▲68,918.0	▲291.8	▲61,902.7	▲24.4%	▲-0.1%	▼9.9%	▼76.7%
2016	▲340.2	▲71,290.9	▲299.0	▲62,668.1	▲2.0%	▲-0.2%	▼8.4%	▼74.3%
2017	▲376.4	▲78,002.3	▲336.3	▲69,685.3	▲9.0%	▲0.3%	▼6.8%	▼67.6%
2018	▲418.2	▲85,607.1	▲385.9	▲78,988.6	▲8.5%	▲0.7%	▼5.8%	▼63.0%
2019	▲448.9	▲90,696.9	▲399.4	▲80,690.2	▲5.4%	▲0.9%	▼5.0%	▼57.2%
2020	▲482.4	▲96,618.9	▲425.5	▲85,225.1	▲6.2%	▲-0.5%	▲5.8%	▲58.4%
2021	▲570.7	▲113,267.8	▲504.5	▲100,129.5	▲13.6%	▲2.4%	▲6.3%	▼55.3%
2022	▲666.3	▲131,034.1	▲519.8	▲102,217.4	▲9.0%	▲8.4%	▼4.7%	▼47.0%
2023	▲717.7	▲139,844.2	▲549.1	▲106,997.4	▲4.0%	▲6.5%	▲4.8%	▼42.8%
2024	▲762.1	▲147,149.5	▲594.2	▲114,728.2	▲4.0%	▲3.0%	4.8%	▼39.2%
2025	▲799.8	▲153,018.7	▲630.8	▲120,692.7	▲3.0%	▲2.0%	4.8%	▼36.5%
2026	▲839.5	▲159,163.6	▲670.7	▲127,144.3	▲3.0%	▲2.0%	4.8%	▼34.0%
2027	▲881.6	▲165,603.8	▲712.0	▲133,760.4	▲3.0%	▲2.0%	4.8%	▼31.3%

== Sectors ==
In 2022, the sector with the highest number of companies registered in Ireland was services, with 145,217 companies, followed by finance, insurance, and real estate and retail trade with 60,561 and 45,541 companies respectively.

=== Aircraft leasing ===
There are 1,200 directly employed in leasing, with Irish lessors managing more than €100 billion in assets. This means that Ireland manages nearly 22% of the fleet of aircraft worldwide and a 40% share of Global fleet of leased aircraft. Ireland has 14 of the top 15 lessors by fleet size.

=== Engineering ===
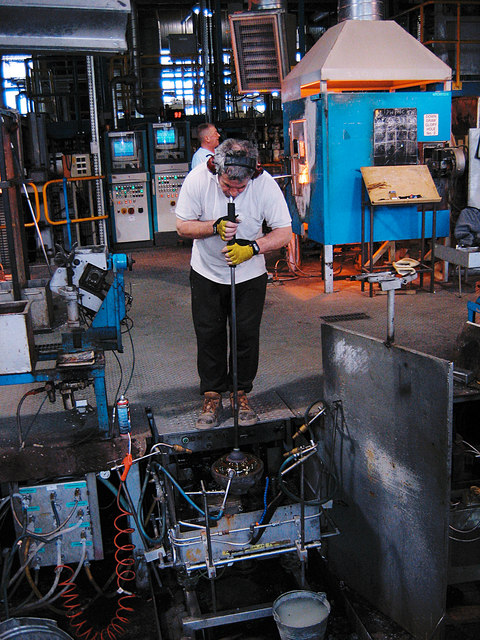
Waterford Crystal glass factory

The multinational engineering sector employs over 18,500 people and contributes approximately 4.2 billion euro annually. This includes approximately 180 companies in areas such of industrial products and services, aerospace, automotive and clean tech.

=== Construction ===
The construction sector in Ireland has been severely affected by the Irish property bubble and the 2008-2013 Irish banking crisis and as a result contributes less to the economy than during the period 2002–2007.

=== Information and communications technology ===
The Information and communications technology (ICT) sector employs over 37,000 people and generates 35 billion annually. The top ten ICT companies are located in Ireland, with over 200 companies in total. A number of these ICT companies are based in Dublin at developments like the Silicon Docks. This includes Google, Facebook, Twitter, LinkedIn, Amazon, eBay, PayPal and Microsoft; several of which have their EMEA / Europe & Middle East headquarters in Ireland. Others operate their European headquarters from Cork, including Apple, EMC and Johnson Controls.

==== Software ====
The software sector employs approximately 24,000 people and contributes 16 billion Euro to the economy. Ireland is the world's second largest exporter of software. The top 10 global technology firms have operations in Ireland including Apple, Google, Facebook and Microsoft. Ireland is home to over 900 software companies.

=== Energy generation ===
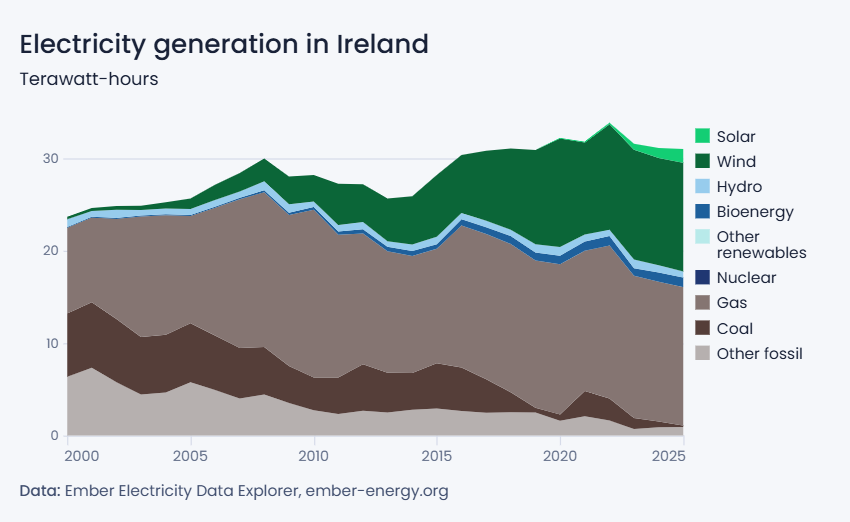
Electricity generation in Ireland in terawatt-hours

Bord Gáis is responsible for the supply and distribution of natural gas, which was first brought ashore in 1976 from the Kinsale Head gas field. Electrical generation from peat consumption, as a percent of total electrical generation, was reduced from 18.8% to 6.1%, between 1990 and 2004. A 2006 forecast by Sustainable Energy Ireland predicts that oil will no longer be used for electrical generation but natural gas will be dominant at 71.3% of the total share, coal at 9.2%, and renewable energy at 8.2% of the market. New or potential sources include the Corrib gas field and the Shannon Liquefied Natural Gas terminal.

In the event of a global transition to renewable energy, Ireland is ranked 12th among 156 countries in an index of geopolitical gains and losses after energy transition (the "GeGaLo Index").

=== Healthcare and medical technologies ===
The Medical technology (MedTech) sector employs nearly 25,000 people and generates 9.4 billion Euro annually, with over one hundred companies in the country.

=== Pharmaceuticals ===
The pharmaceutical sector employs approximately 50,000 people and is responsible for 55 billion euro of exports. A number of these companies are based in County Cork, at Little Island and Ringaskiddy.

=== Agri-food sector ===
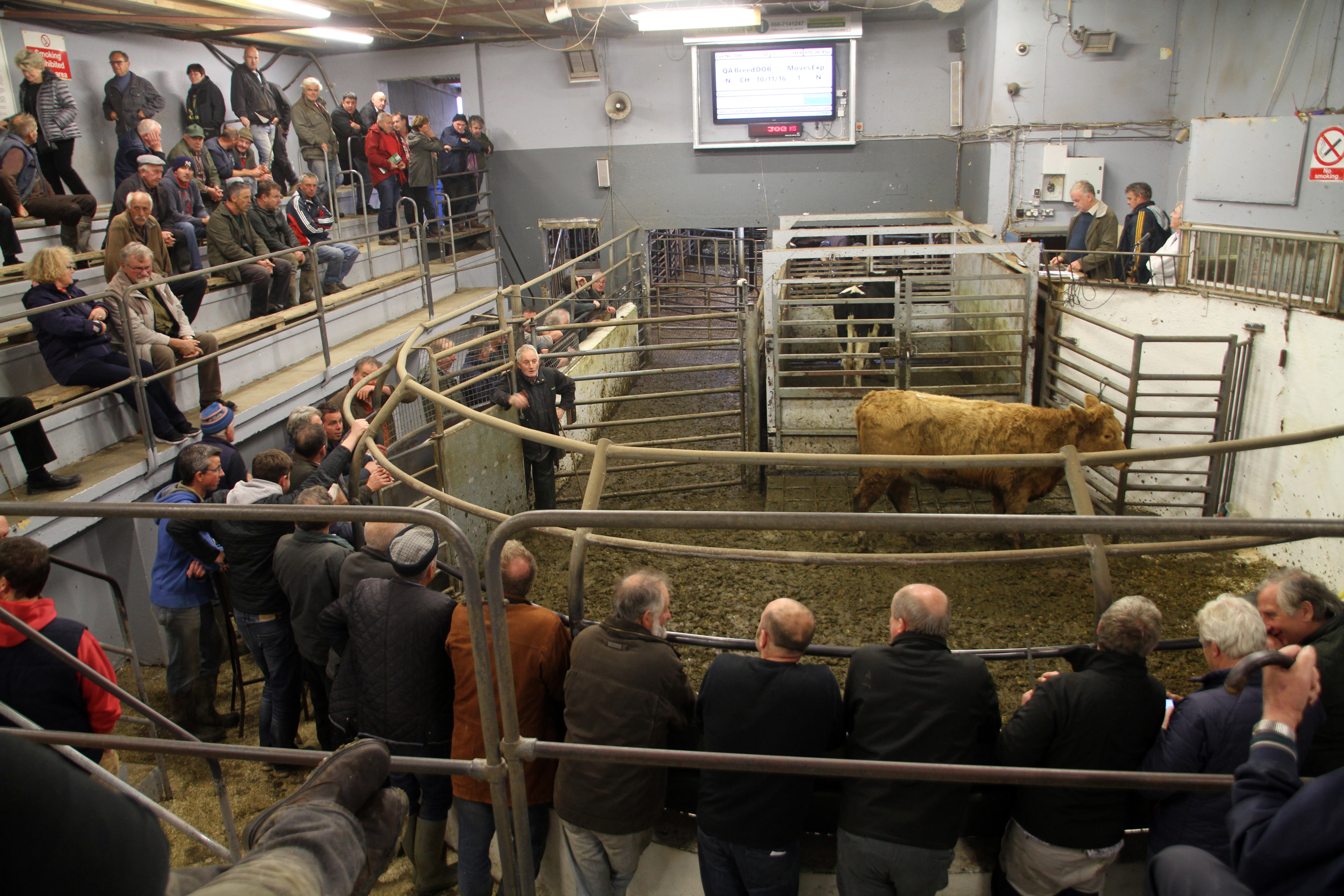
Cattle auction in Castleisland

The primary sector of the economy (including agriculture, forestry, mining and fishing) constitutes about 5% of Irish GDP, and 8% of Irish employment. One of Ireland's main agricultural resources is its large fertile pastures, particularly in the midland and southern regions.

In 2017, agriculture was estimated to contribute approximately 1% of GDP.

During 2019, Ireland produced (in addition to smaller productions of other agricultural products), 1.4 million tons of barley, 595 thousand tons of wheat, 382 thousand tons of potato, and 193 thousand tons of oats. In the same year, Ireland produced 8.2 billion liters of cow's milk (making it the 20th largest producer in the world), 304 thousand tons of pork, 141 thousand tons of chicken meat, and 66 thousand tons of lamb meat.

According to Teagasc, the Irish agri-food sector generated 7% of gross value added (€13.9 billion) during 2016, and accounted for 8.5% of national employment and 9.8% of Ireland's merchandise exports. This included cattle, beef, and dairy product exports. Ireland's agri-food exports include several high-value dairy brands, and are led by a number of Irish companies including Kerry Group, Glanbia, Greencore and Ornua.

By the late nineteenth century, the island was mostly deforested. In 2005, after years of national afforestation programmes, about 9% of Ireland has become forested. It is still one of the least forested countries in the EU and heavily relies on imported wood. Its coastline – once abundant in fish, particularly cod – has suffered overfishing and since 1995 the fisheries industry has focused more on aquaculture. Freshwater salmon and trout stocks in Ireland's waterways have also been depleted but are being better managed.

=== Alcoholic beverage industry ===
The drinks industry employs approximately 92,000 people and contributes 2 billion euro annually to the Irish economy making it one of the biggest sectors. It supports jobs in agriculture, distilling and brewing. It is subdivided into 5 areas; beer (employing 1,800 people directly and 35,000 indirectly), cider (supporting 5,000 jobs), spirits (supporting 14,700 jobs), whiskey (employing 748 people with turnover of 400 million euro) and wine (employing 1,100 directly).

=== Mining ===
Ireland is a major exporter of zinc to the EU and mining also produces significant quantities of lead and alumina.

Beyond this, the country has significant deposits of gypsum, limestone, and smaller quantities of copper, silver, gold, barite, and dolomite. Peat extraction has historically been important, especially from midland bogs, however more efficient fuels and environmental protection of bogs has reduced peat's importance to the economy. Natural gas extraction occurs in the Kinsale Gas Field and the Corrib Gas Field in the southern and western counties, where there is 19.82 bn cubic metres of proven reserves.

=== Financial sector ===
The financial services sector employs approximately 35,000 people and contributes 2 billion euro in taxes annually to the economy. Ireland is the seventh largest provider of wholesale financial services in Europe. A number of these firms are located at the International Financial Services Centre (IFSC) in Dublin.

While there are over 60 credit institutions incorporated in Ireland, the banking system is dominated by the AIB Bank, Bank of Ireland and Ulster Bank. There is a large Credit Union movement within the country which offers an alternative to the banks. The Irish Stock Exchange is in Dublin, however, due to its small size, many firms also maintain listings on either the London Stock Exchange or the NASDAQ. That being said, the Irish Stock Exchange has a leading position as a listing domicile for cross-border funds. By accessing the Irish Stock Exchange, investment companies can market their shares to a wider range of investors (under MiFID although this will change somewhat with the introduction of the AIFM Directive. Service providers abound for the cross-border funds business and Ireland has been recently rated with a DAW Index score of 4 in 2012. Similarly, the insurance industry in Ireland is a leader in both retail markets and corporate customers in the EU, in large part due to the International Financial Services Centre.

=== Retail ===
In Ireland, the retail sector provides one of the largest sources of employment in the economy, representing over 12% of the workforce. As of 2017, approximately 40,000 wholesale and retail businesses employed almost 280,000 people in Ireland, with the Department of Enterprise, Trade and Employment reporting that 90% of these businesses were Irish-owned.

As of 2017, the retail market was worth €40 billion annually, with the supermarket sector reportedly comprising €9 billion of this figure. For the same period, €5 billion was spent by Irish consumers with online retailers - €3 billion of this going to non-Irish sites.

=== Tourism ===
In Ireland, the retail sector provides one of the largest sources of employment in the economy, representing over 12% of the workforce. As of 2017, approximately 40,000 wholesale and retail businesses employed almost 280,000 people in Ireland, with the Department of Enterprise, Trade and Employment reporting that 90% of these businesses were Irish-owned.

As of 2017, the retail market was worth €40 billion annually, with the supermarket sector reportedly comprising €9 billion of this figure. For the same period, €5 billion was spent by Irish consumers with online retailers - €3 billion of this going to non-Irish sites.

=== Transport ===
Most of the transport system in Ireland is in public hands, either side of the Irish border. The Irish road network has evolved separately in the two jurisdictions into which Ireland is divided, while the Irish rail network was mostly created prior to the partition of Ireland.

In the Republic of Ireland, the Minister for Transport, acting through the Department of Transport, is responsible for the state's road network, rail network, public transport, airports and several other areas. Although some sections of road have been built using private or public-private funds, and are operated as toll roads, they are owned by the Government of Ireland. The rail network is also state-owned and operated, while the government currently still owns the main airports. Public transport is mainly in the hands of a statutory corporation, Córas Iompair Éireann (CIÉ), and its subsidiaries, Dublin Bus, Bus Éireann (Irish Bus), and Iarnród Éireann (Irish Rail).

On 1 November 2005, the Irish government published the Transport 21 plan which includes €18bn for improved roads and €16bn for improved rail, including the Western Railway Corridor and the Dublin Metro.

The Republic of Ireland's transport sector is responsible for 21% of the state's greenhouse gas emissions.

In Northern Ireland, the road network and railways are in state ownership. The Department for Infrastructure is responsible for these and other areas (such as water services). Two of the three main airports in Northern Ireland are privately operated and owned. The exception is City of Derry Airport, which is owned and funded by Derry City and Strabane District Council A statutory corporation, the Northern Ireland Transport Holding Company (which trades as Translink) operates public transport services through its three subsidiaries – NI Railways Company Limited, Ulsterbus Limited, and Citybus Limited (now branded as Metro).

== Trade and investments ==
=== Exports ===
Exports of Ireland by product category (2019) Chemical products Transportation Machines Mineral products Plastics and rubbers Metals Foodstuffs Precious metals Textiles Instruments Animal products Vegetable products Paper goods Footwear and headwear Miscellaneous Stone and glass Wood products Animal and vegetable bi-products Animal hides Arts and antiques Weapons

Exports play an important role in Ireland's economic growth. The country is one of the largest exporters of pharmaceuticals, medical devices and software-related goods and services in the world.

A series of significant discoveries of base metal deposits have been made, including the giant ore deposit at Tara Mine. Zinc-lead ores are also currently mined from two other underground operations in Lisheen and Galmoy. Ireland now ranks as the seventh largest producer of zinc concentrates in the world, and the twelfth largest producer of lead concentrates. The combined output from these mines make Ireland the largest zinc producer in Europe and the second largest producer of lead.

In its Globalization Index 2010 published in January 2011 Ernst and Young with the Economist Intelligence Unit ranked Ireland second after Hong Kong. The index ranks 60 countries according to their degree of globalisation relative to their GDP. While the Irish economy had significant debt problems in 2011, exporting remained a success.

== Taxation and welfare ==
=== Welfare benefits ===
As of December 2007, Ireland's net unemployment benefits for long-term unemployed people across four family types (single people, lone parents, single-income couples with and without children) was the third highest of the OECD countries (jointly with Iceland) after Denmark and Switzerland. Jobseeker's Allowance or Jobseeker's Benefit for a single person in Ireland is €208 per week, as of January 2022.

As of 2018, state provided (contributory) old age pensions had a maximum weekly rate of €248.30 for a single pensioner aged between 66 and 80. The maximum weekly rate for the state pension (non-contributory) was €237 for a single pensioner aged between 66 and 80.

=== Income distribution and taxation ===
Total tax revenue as a percentage of GDP for Ireland over the past several decades compared to other highly developed countries

The percentage of the population at risk of relative poverty was 21% in 2004 – one of the highest rates in the European Union. Ireland's inequality of income distribution score on the Gini coefficient scale was 30.4 in 2000, slightly below the OECD average of 31. The daily median income was $50.49 (PPP) in 2023. Sustained increases in the value of residential property during the 1990s and up to late 2006 was a key factor in the increase in personal wealth in Ireland, with Ireland ranking second only to Japan in personal wealth in 2006.

From 1975 to 2005, tax revenues fluctuated at around 30% of GDP (see graph right).

== Currency ==
Before the introduction of the euro notes and coins in January 2002, Ireland used the Irish pound. In January 1999 Ireland was one of eleven European Union member states which launched the European Single Currency, the euro. Euro banknotes are issued in €5, €10, €20, €50, €100, €200 and €500 denominations and share the common design used across Europe, however like other countries in the eurozone, Ireland has its own unique design on one face of euro coins. The government decided on a single national design for all Irish coin denominations, which show a Celtic harp, a traditional symbol of Ireland, decorated with the year of issue and the word Éire which means "Ireland" in the Irish language.

== See also ==
- Economy of Dublin
- Economy of Cork
- Economy of Limerick
- Economy of Northern Ireland
- Corporation tax in the Republic of Ireland
- Irish Fiscal Advisory Council
- List of companies of Ireland
