= Barry Cannon =

Irish academic

- Born: County Donegal, Ireland

Academic background
- Education: Dublin City University
- Thesis: Populist leadership in the context of globalisation: a comparative study of President Chávez of Venezuela and ex-President Fujimori of Peru (2005)
- Doctoral advisor: Peadar Kirby

Barry Cannon is an Irish academic specialising development and democratisation who is from County Donegal, Ireland. Focusing on politics in Latin America, democracy and far-right politics, he currently serves as a senior lecturer and associate professor at Maynooth University. He has been featured in multiple media outlets, including BBC World Service, The Irish Times and RTÉ.

== Education ==
In 1985, Cannon earned his Bachelor of Arts in English and history from the University College Dublin. For the next 15 years, Cannon travelled to England, Spain and Peru, working in local government, English teaching and development. In 1995, while in London, Cannon obtained his Master of Science in sociology. In 2000, he returned to Ireland to earn his PhD from the Dublin City University, studying Latin American populism under Peadar Kirby. While spending eight months in Peru and Venezuela studying for his PhD, Cannon witnessed the 2002 Venezuelan coup d'état attempt and in 2004, he completed his PhD at Dublin City University.

== Work ==
After completing his studies at Dublin City University, Cannon worked for Irish NGO Comhlamh on an Irish Aid project for international volunteering. At this time, Cannon created a Code of Practice for organisation that sent volunteers internationally and a Volunteer Charter, both used by the Irish Aid. Cannon returned to the Dublin City University School of Law and Government in 2006 helping organisations in Nicaragua, El Salvador and Honduras, with the project aiding local governments and research. At this time, he witnessed a second coup, the 2009 Honduran coup d'état.

Cannon's work initially focused on politics in Latin America, with his first works focusing on leftist governments such as the Bolivarian government in Venezuela and later studying right-wing politics in the region. From 2010 to 2013, he was a postdoctoral researcher at the University of Salamanca.

In 2013, Cannon began work as a lecturer and assistant professor for Maynooth University. The Irish Research Council funded the Stop Far Right research project led by Cannon and in collaboration with Crosscare, which began in 2021 in an attempt by Ireland have researchers collaborate on how to combat the far-right. During the 2022–23 Irish anti-immigration protests, he consulted BreakingNews.ie, saying that the far-right were attempting to capitalise on social conflict to achieve increased support. From 2022 to 2023, his research turned towards a focus on global citizenship.

== Awards and recognition ==
In 2010, the Government of Ireland awarded Cannon a postdoctoral fellowship position through Irish Aid and the Irish Research Council. In 2012, Cannon along with co-author Peadar Kirby presented the President of Ireland, Michael D. Higgins, their book Civil Society and the State in Left-Led Latin America. His book The Right in Latin America: Elite Power, Hegemony and the Struggle for the State was listed in the Selection of 2016 Publications selected by the Irish Research Council in their annual review.

== Publications ==
=== Books ===
- Cannon, Barry; Kirby, Peadar, eds. (2012). Civil Society and the State in Left-Led Latin America : Challenges and Limitations to Democratization. London: Zed Books, Limited. ISBN 978-1780322049.
- Cannon, Barry (2010). Hugo Chavez and the Boliviarian revolution : populism and democracy in a globalised age (1st ed.). Manchester: Manchester University Press. ISBN 978-0719077722.

=== Journals ===
- Cannon, Barry (December 2014). "As Clear as MUD: Characteristics, Objectives, and Strategies of the Opposition in Bolivarian Venezuela" (PDF). Latin American Politics and Society. 56 (4): 49–70. doi:10.1111/j.1548-2456.2014.00248.x.
- Cannon, Barry; Murphy, Mary P. (30 July 2014). "Where are the Pots and Pans? Collective Responses in Ireland to Neoliberalization in a Time of Crisis: Learning from Latin America" (PDF). Irish Political Studies. 30 (1): 1–19. doi:10.1080/07907184.2014.942292.
- (in Spanish) Cannon, Barry (2014). "El poder de la derecha y la influencía permanente de la élite en Centroamérica." 35 (56): 78–105.
- Cannon, Barry; Hume, Mo (December 2012). "Central America, civil society and the 'pink tide': democratization or de-democratization?" (PDF). Democratization. 19 (6): 1039–1064. doi:10.1080/13510347.2011.619775.
- Cannon, Barry (August 2010). "Wanted! 'Strong publics' for uncertain times: the project" (PDF). Development in Practice. 20 (6): 649–663. doi:10.1080/09614524.2010.491533.
- Cannon, Barry (June 2008). "Class/Race Polarisation in Venezuela and the Electoral Success of Hugo Chávez: a break with the past or the song remains the same?" (PDF). Third World Quarterly. 29 (4): 731–748. doi:10.1080/01436590802075020.
- Cannon, Barry (July 2004). "Venezuela, April 2002: Coup or Popular Rebellion? The Myth of a United Venezuela" (PDF). Bulletin of Latin American Research. 23 (3): 285–302. doi:10.1111/j.0261-3050.2004.00109.x.
