= Heather Laskey =

Irish journalist and writer (born 1936)

Heather Laskey (married name O'Brien; born 1936) is an Irish journalist and writer. Known for the 1985 book Children of the Poor Clares, Laskey was, together with Mavis Arnold, one of the first to bring public attention to the systemic abuse carried out in industrial schools.

== Bibliography ==
- Arnold, Mavis; Laskey, Heather (1985). Children of the Poor Clares: The Collusion Between Church and State That Betrayed Thousands of Children in Ireland's Industrial Schools. Belfast: Appletree Press.
- Laskey, Heather (2003). Night Voices: Heard in the Shadow of Hitler and Stalin. Montreal, Quebec: McGill–Queen's University Press. ISBN 9780773526068.
