= Bruce Arnold (author) =

English journalist and author (1936–2024)

Bruce Arnold OBE FRSL
- Born: 6 September 1936; London, England
- Died: 2 May 2024 (aged 87); Dublin, Ireland
- Education: Trinity College Dublin
- Occupations: Journalist, author
- Spouse: Mavis Arnold (m. 1959; died 2017)
- Children: 2
- Relatives: Guy Arnold (brother)
- Writing career
- Subjects: Literary criticism and art criticism
- Notable works: A Singer at the Wedding, The Song of the Nightingale, The Muted Swan
- Notable awards: Fellow of Trinity College Dublin, Fellow of the Royal Society of Literature

Bruce Croft Arnold OBE FRSL (6 September 1936 – 2 May 2024) was an English journalist and author who lived in Ireland from 1957. His main expertise was in the fields of literary criticism and art criticism.

In 1983 it emerged that his telephone had been bugged by Charles Haughey in the Irish phone tapping scandal. He and the other bugged journalists were considered to have "anti-national" views.

== Early life ==
Arnold was educated at Kingham Hill School and at Trinity College, Dublin, where he graduated with a degree in modern languages (English and French) in 1960. His wife Mavis Arnold was also a journalist. They had two children, a son and a daughter. Arnold's older brother Guy Arnold was also an author, largely on African politics.

== Journalism ==
Arnold worked for the main Irish newspapers based in Dublin – The Irish Times from 1965; The Irish Press and the Sunday Independent. He also acted as Dublin correspondent of The Guardian. He edited Hibernia and the Dublin Magazine (1962–68; formerly The Dubliner).

== Death ==
Arnold died of pneumonia in the Glenageary area of Dublin, on 2 May 2024, at the age of 87.

== Partial bibliography ==
=== Fiction ===
- A Singer at the Wedding (London: Hamish Hamilton 1978; rep. Abacus 1991);
- The Song of the Nightingale (London: Hamish Hamilton 1980; rep. Abacus 1991);
- The Muted Swan (London: Hamish Hamilton 1981; rep. Abacus 1991);
- Running to Paradise (London: Hamish Hamilton 1983; rep. Abacus 1991).

=== Non-fiction ===
- A Concise History of Irish Art (London: Thames & Hudson, 1969; also New York: Praeger 1968)
- Orpen: Mirror to an Age (London: Jonathan Cape, 1981)
- What Kind of Country? (London: Jonathan Cape, 1984)
- Margaret Thatcher: A Study in Power (London: Hamish Hamilton, 1984)
- An Art Atlas of Britain and Ireland (London: Penguin/Viking, 1991)
- Orpen: William Orpen 1878-1931 (Dublin: Town House, 1991) "Lives of Irish Artists" series
- The Scandal of Ulysses (London: Sinclair Stevenson 1991; New York: St. Martin's Press 1992; Dublin: Liffey 2005)
- Mainie Jellett and the Modern Movement in Ireland (London: Yale UP 1991; New York: Yale UP, 1992)
- Haughey: His Life and Unlucky Deeds (London: HarperCollins, 1993)
- Swift: An Illustrated Life (Dublin: Lilliput, 1999)
- The Spire and Other Essays on Modern Irish Culture (foreword by Charles Lysaght) (Dublin: Liffey Press 2003)
- He That Is Down Need Fear No Fall (Ashfield Press, 2008)
- The Fight for Democracy: The Libertas Voice in Europe (2009) (about the Libertas Institute)
- The Irish Gulag: How the State Betrayed its Innocent Children (2009) (published just before the Commission to Inquire into Child Abuse report)
- Derek Hill (2010)
- The End of the Party with Jason O'Toole (Gill & MacMillan, 2011);

== Film ==
- The Scandal of Ulysses; Images of Joyce
- To Make it Live: Mainie Jellett 1897–1944

== Libretto ==
- A Passionate Man

== Awards ==
He was an honorary Fellow of Trinity College Dublin, a Fellow of the Royal Society of Literature and an honorary member of the Royal Hibernian Academy. He was awarded an honorary doctorate by University College Dublin (UCD), and in the 2003 Birthday Honours was appointed an Officer of the Order of the British Empire (OBE) for services to journalism and UK-Irish relations.

== Sources ==
- Arnold, Bruce (February 2003). "Bruce Arnold: The Spy Who Loves Us". The Dubliner. Archived from the original on 4 April 2009.
- Doran, Antoinette (2005). "Papers of Bruce Arnold" (PDF). Collection List. National Library of Ireland. No. 114.
