= Economy of Cork =

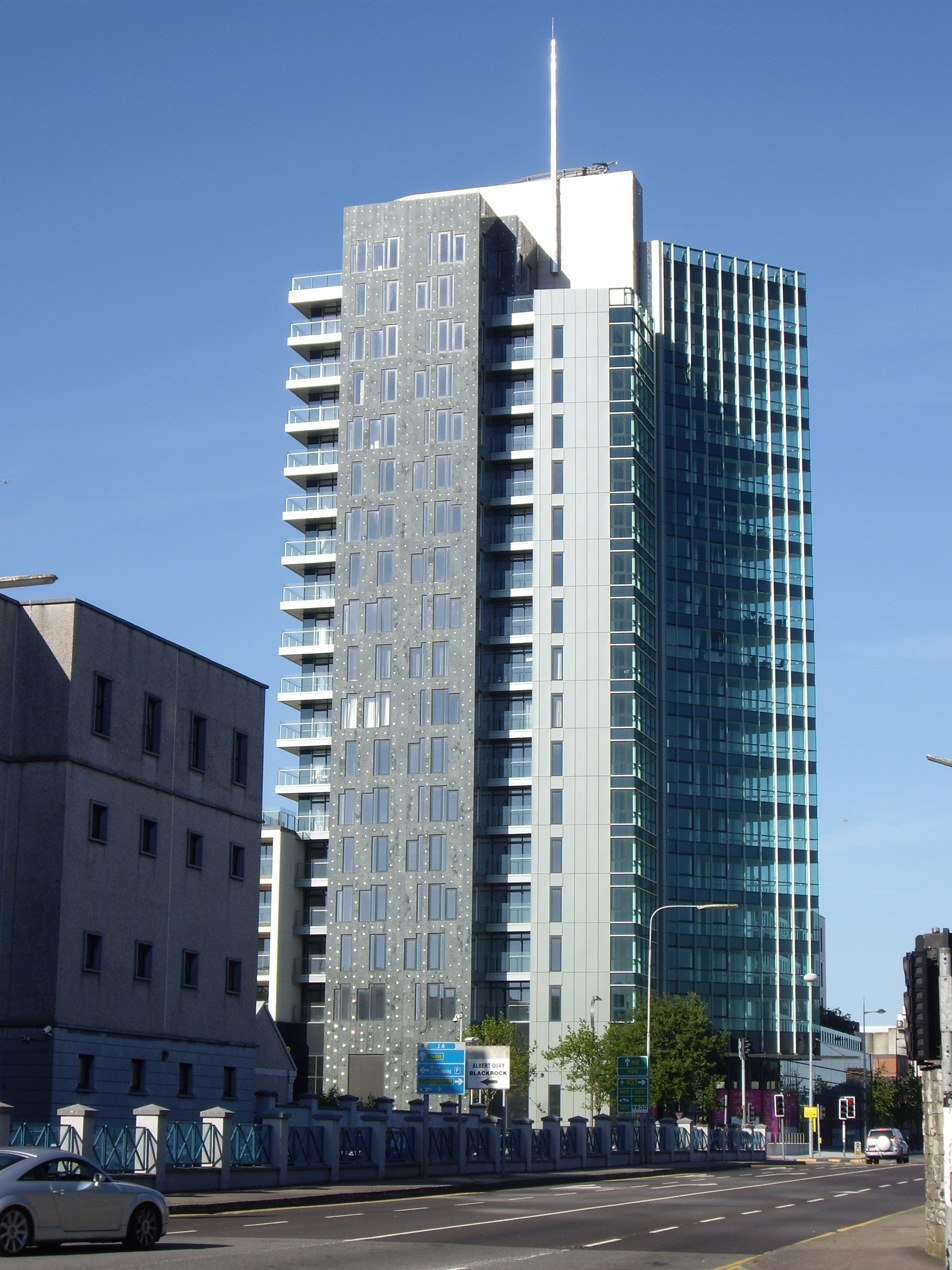
The Elysian in Cork City, the third tallest building in the Republic of Ireland and tallest in Cork.

The second largest city in Ireland, Cork, has an economy focused on the city centre and its harbour. As of 2022, over 103,000 people were working in the city, with the majority in full-time employment. In a 2011 employment survey, the largest employers in the area included several public sector organisations, including Cork University Hospital, University College Cork, Cork City Council, Cork Institute of Technology and Collins Barracks. Apple Inc. was the largest private sector employer, followed by Boston Scientific, Bon Secours Hospital, Supervalu / Centra Distribution Ltd and Mercy University Hospital. As of 2026, the Cork area was home to approximately 11 percent of Ireland's population, while contributing up to 19 percent of gross domestic product (GDP).

== Industry and workforce ==
Most of the industry in Cork is concentrated around the Greater Cork area, taking in Cork city and its hinterland. The Cork city area, including its suburbs, had a population of over 224,000 as of the 2022 census. As of 2016, approximately 42,000 workers travel into the city and suburbs to work every day. The majority of those commuters come from Cork County (91%), Waterford City and County, and Kerry (2%). By the 2022 census, of the 113,067 people working in the city and suburbs, 60% were residents and a further 45,567 daytime workers commuted into the area.

Some of the companies within this area include Pfizer (pharmaceutical), Stryker (medical technology), Apple Inc. (European HQ) and Boston Scientific (biotechnology). Other employers include EMC (data storage), Bord Gáis (energy), Amazon (customer services for online retail), GlaxoSmithKline (pharmaceutical), Johnson & Johnson (pharmaceutical), Siemens Group (third party multi-lingual tech support), the Marriott Group (shared services and customer service contact centre), McAfee (security software) and VMware (enterprise software).

There are two key third-level institutions in the city, Munster Technological University (MTU) and University College Cork (UCC), which (as of 2011) were the sixth and third largest employers in the city respectively - the latter employing approximately 2,800 people.

== Information Technology and pharmaceuticals ==
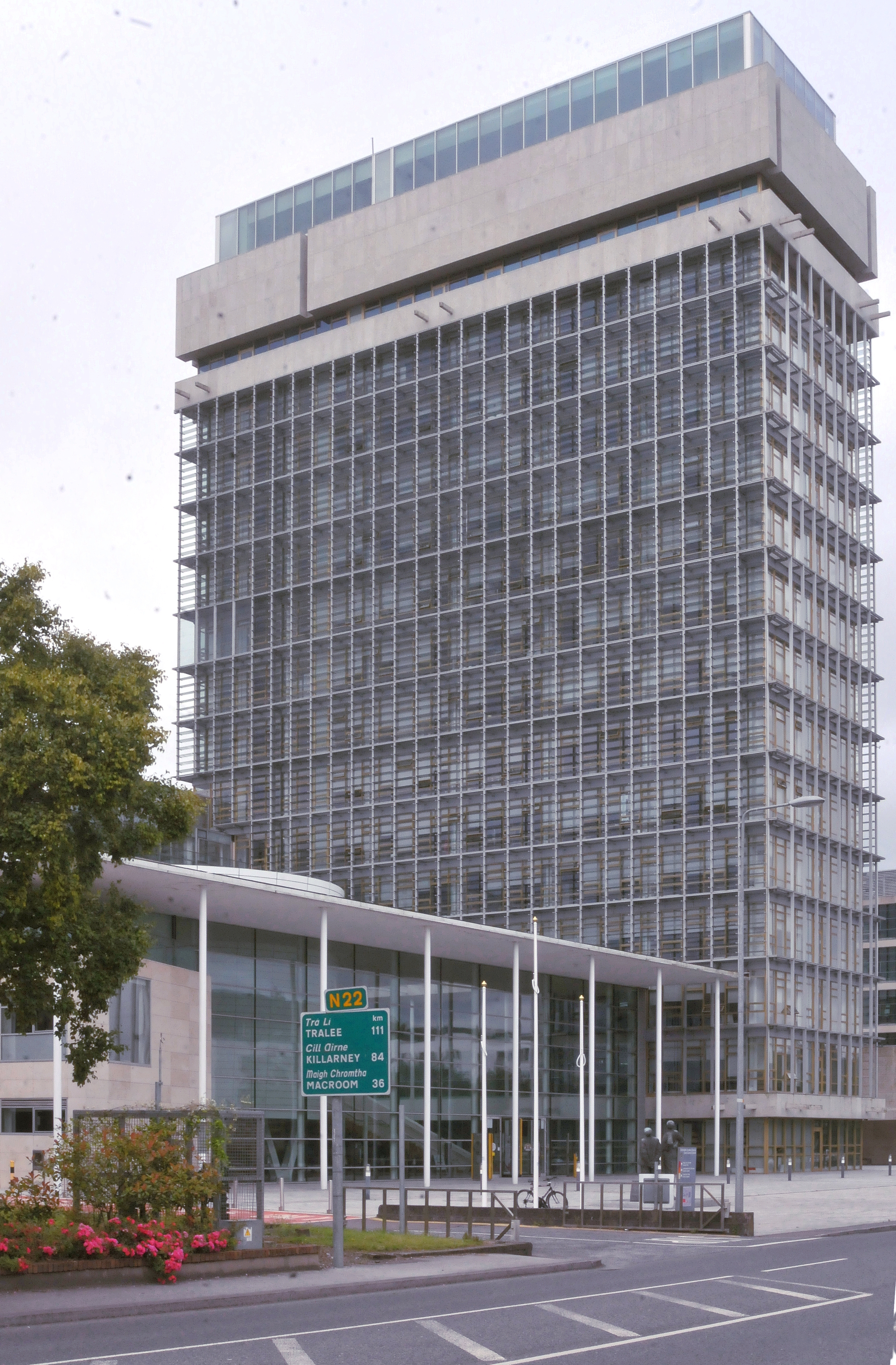
Cork County Hall

Information Technology multinationals such as Apple, Amazon, EMC, IBM, McAfee Ireland Limited, SolarWinds, Siemens and VMware INC have a presence in the city. As of 2020, there were over 190 multinationals operating in Cork, employing approximately 43,000 people in the area. Over 6,000 people were based at Apple's Hollyhill campus in 2020.

The area around Cork is also home to a number of pharmaceutical and bio-pharmaceutical companies, with a number of pharmaceutical companies located in Little Island and Ringaskiddy. Of ten new drug-substance plants established in Ireland between 1975 and 1986, six were established in the Cork area.

== Retail ==
Mahon Point Shopping Centre, opened in 2005, is Cork's largest shopping center. Other larger retail centres in the city's suburbs include Wilton Shopping Centre, Blackpool Shopping Centre, and two centres in Douglas. Within the city centre, retail is centred on the St Patrick's Street and Oliver Plunkett Street areas. At the end of 2024, retail vacancy was reportedly 17% on St Patrick's Street and 9% on Oliver Plunkett Street, down from 20% and 10% respectively from 2023.

== Offices and business parks ==
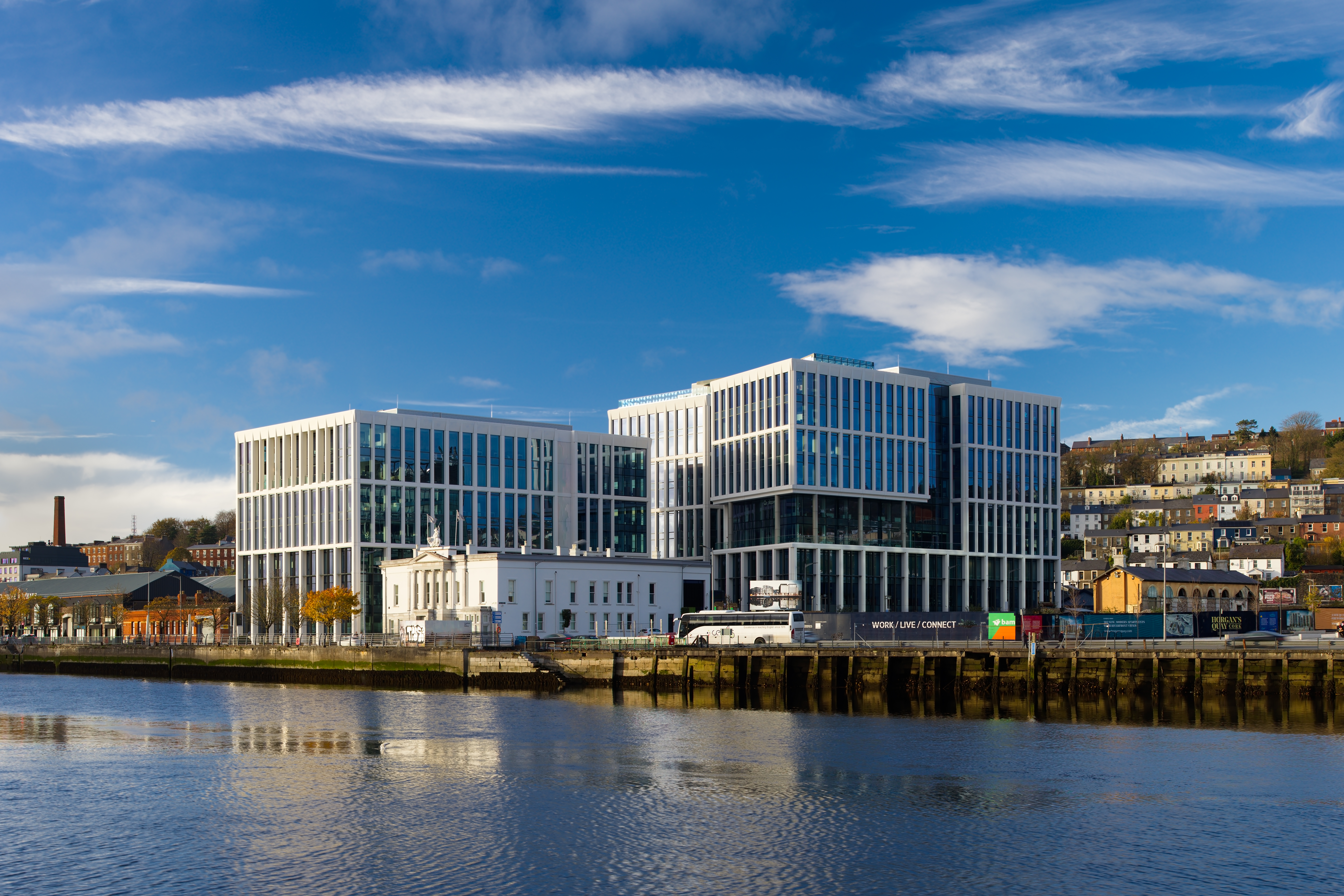
Office buildings at Penrose Dock, Cork

Larger office buildings in the city include Half Moon Street, Penrose Dock and One Albert Quay in the city centre, with Linn Dubh and The Atrium in Blackpool, and City Gate Park in Mahon.

The larger IDA business parks in Cork City and surroundings include Little Island Business Park and Cork Airport Business Park. Other smaller parks include Cork Business and Technology Park, Kilbarry Business and Technology Park, Carrigtwohill Business and Technology Park and Ringaskiddy Business Park.

Recent city centre office developments have included One Albert Quay, consisting of 175,000 sq ft of office space over seven levels on Albert Quay. Opened in March 2016, it is home to Johnson Controls, PricewaterhouseCoopers, and Investec, and described by its developer as "Ireland's smartest building". In the city centre, a 46,000 sq ft office development was completed in January 2019 on the South Mall, and has KPMG and Forcepoint as tenants.

== Planned developments ==
As of December 2019, several developments were underway within the city, with over 1,000,000 square foot of offices reportedly under construction or in the planning stages. This included the proposed €150 million development of accommodation, offices, retail and an event centre at the old Beamish and Crawford brewery site. While a "sod-turning" event was held on the site in 2016, construction had commenced only in certain areas of the development by 2018, and the events centre was not still not realised as of 2026.

As of 2020, ongoing developments in the city included a €90 million office scheme at "Navigation Square" on Albert Quay, and a €400 million office, hotel, retail and residential development at Horgans Quay and Cork Kent railway station. Planned developments outside the city include a proposed data centre in Little Island, and several projects around Cork Harbour. The latter included a €40m redevelopment of Spike Island as a tourist attraction, with a further €40m to clean up the former Irish Steel/Irish Ispat site on Haulbowline Island.

In June 2026, the Irish government approved a preliminary business case for further development of the Cork City Docklands. The business case includes the proposed development of a 147-hectare brownfield site "potentially supporting up to 25,000 jobs". Also, as of 2026, a number of transport infrastructure projects, including BusConnects and a proposed light rail system, were in the planning or consultation phases.

== See also ==
- Economy of Dublin
- Economy of Belfast
- Economy of Limerick
- Economy of Ireland
