= Economy of Belfast =

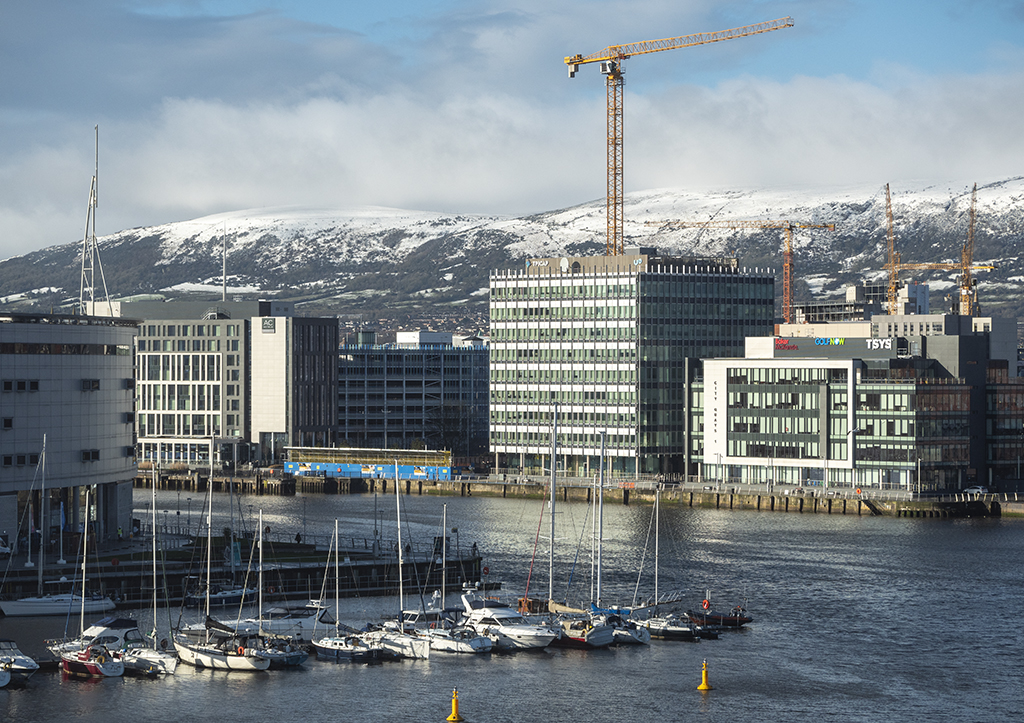
- Belfast City Quays

Statistics
- Population: 348,005 (2022)
- GDP: £19.7 billion (2023)
- GDP per capita: £50,785 (2022)

The economy of Belfast, Northern Ireland was initially built on trade through Belfast Harbour. Later, industry contributed to its growth, particularly shipbuilding and linen. At the beginning of the 20th century Belfast was both the largest producer of linen in the world and also boasted the world's largest shipyard. Civil unrest impacted the city's industry for many years, but with the republican and loyalist ceasefires of the mid-1990s, Good Friday Agreement and the St Andrews Agreement in 2006, the city's economy has seen some resurgence once again.

== History of the economy ==
When the population of Belfast town began to grow in the 17th century, its economy was built on commerce. It provided a market for the surrounding countryside and the natural inlet of Belfast Lough gave the city its own port. The port supplied an avenue for trade with Great Britain and later Europe and North America. In the mid-seventeenth century, Belfast exported beef, butter, hides, tallow and corn and it imported coal, cloth, wine, brandy, paper, timber and tobacco. Around this time, the linen trade in Northern Ireland blossomed and by the middle of the eighteenth century, one fifth of all the linen exported from Ireland was shipped from Belfast. The present city however is a product of the Industrial Revolution. It was not until industry transformed the linen and shipbuilding trades that the economy and the population boomed. By the turn of the nineteenth century, Belfast had transformed into the largest linen producing centre in the world, earning the city and its hinterlands the nickname "Linenopolis" during the Victorian Era and into the early part of the 20th century. 100,000 people in the city, mainly women, were employed in its linen trade by the 1900s and 1910s, although shipbuilding had overtaken it to become the dominant industry since the 1870s.

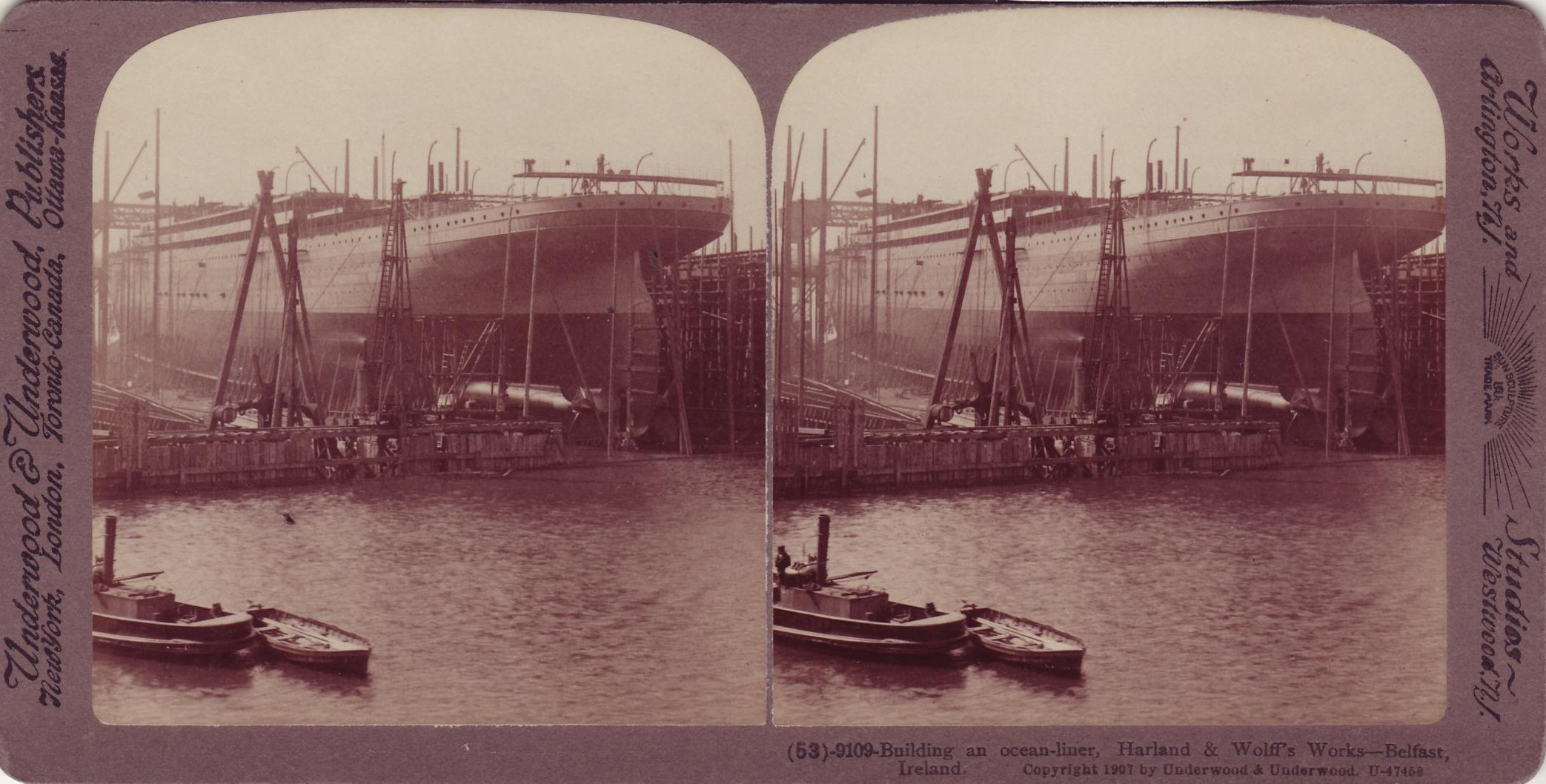
Harland & Wolff shipyard in 1907

Belfast harbour was dredged in 1845 to provide deeper berths for larger ships. Donegall Quay was built out into the river as the harbour was developed further and trade flourished. The Harland & Wolff shipbuilding firm was created in 1861 and by the time the Titanic was built in Belfast in 1912, they boasted the largest shipyard in the world.

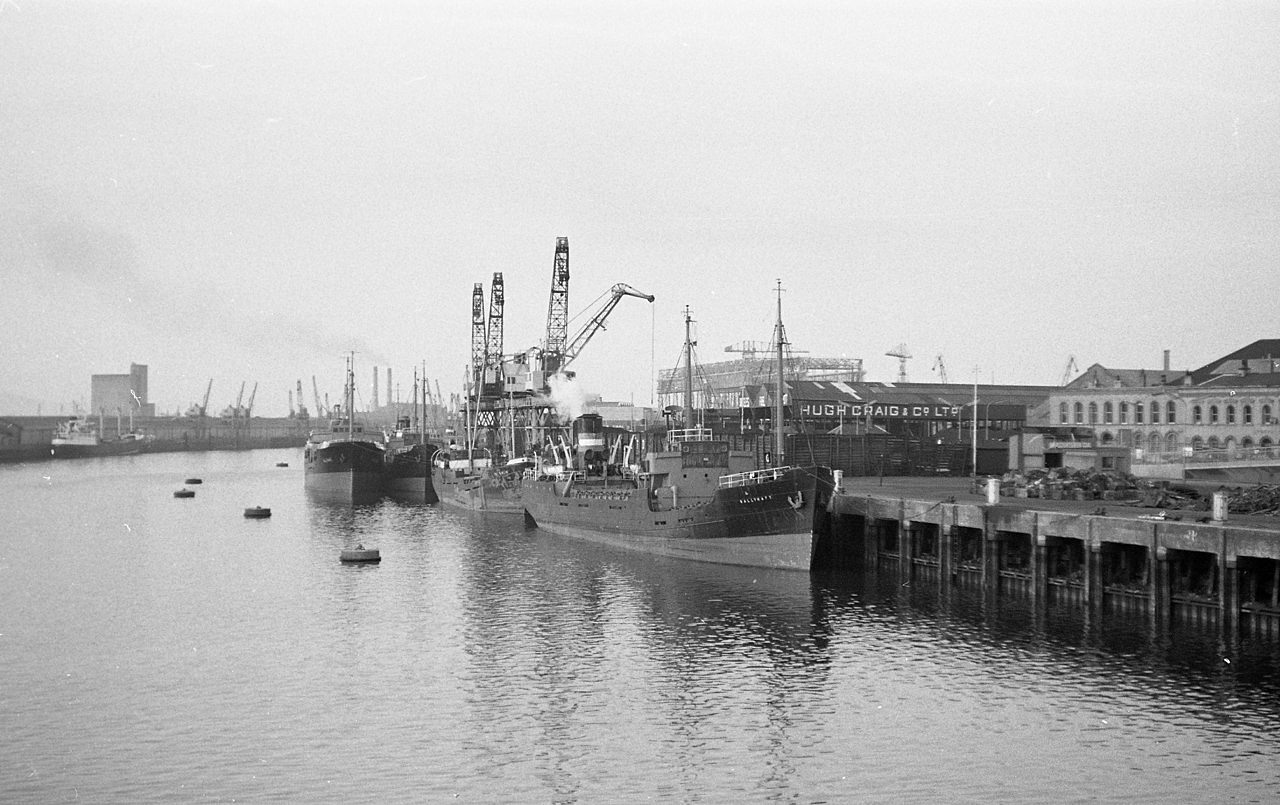
John Kelly Limited steam collier “Ballyhaft”, Queens Quay, Belfast 1968

The economic importance of coal cannot be overstated in Belfast in the early 1900s. Coal was imported into Belfast and the other major ports. It was then distributed throughout Ulster by rail and lorry. Belfast harbour contained several coal companies, the big three were Cawoods Coal, Hugh Craig & Co. and John Kelly Limited. Samuel Kelly set up a grocer and coal commissions company in the 1840s. When Samuel died, his son, John Kelly took over and expanded the fleet. By the turn of the century, Kelly's had grown to a workforce of around 10,000, and would continue to create ships to import and export coal, as well as having multiple offices and yards in many towns such as Carrickfergus. John Kelly died in 1904, this is when his son, Sir Samuel Kelly would become owner, and make the business into a limited company, under John Kelly Limited. Kelly was knighted for his contributions to the economy, as his fleet reached its biggest size of 44 steam coasters in 1937, the year in which Sir Samuel Kelly passed away. John Kelly Limited would be passed to his wife, Lady Kelly, as Capt. William Clint would becoming managing director. As coal began to be phased out, Kelly's opted in to the oil industry, and changed to Kelly's Fuels, in which it still operates today.

The rise of mass-produced and cotton clothing following World War I were some of the factors which led to the decline of Belfast's international linen trade. Like many UK cities dependent on traditional heavy industry, Belfast suffered serious decline since the 1960s, exacerbated greatly in the 1970s and 1980s by the civil unrest of The Troubles. More than 100,000 manufacturing jobs have been lost since the 1970s. For several decades, Northern Ireland's fragile economy required significant public support from the British exchequer of up to £4 billion per year. Ongoing sectarian violence made it difficult for Belfast to compete with Ireland's Celtic Tiger economy, with Dublin producing some 70bn Euro GDP annually.

== Economic development and regeneration initiatives ==
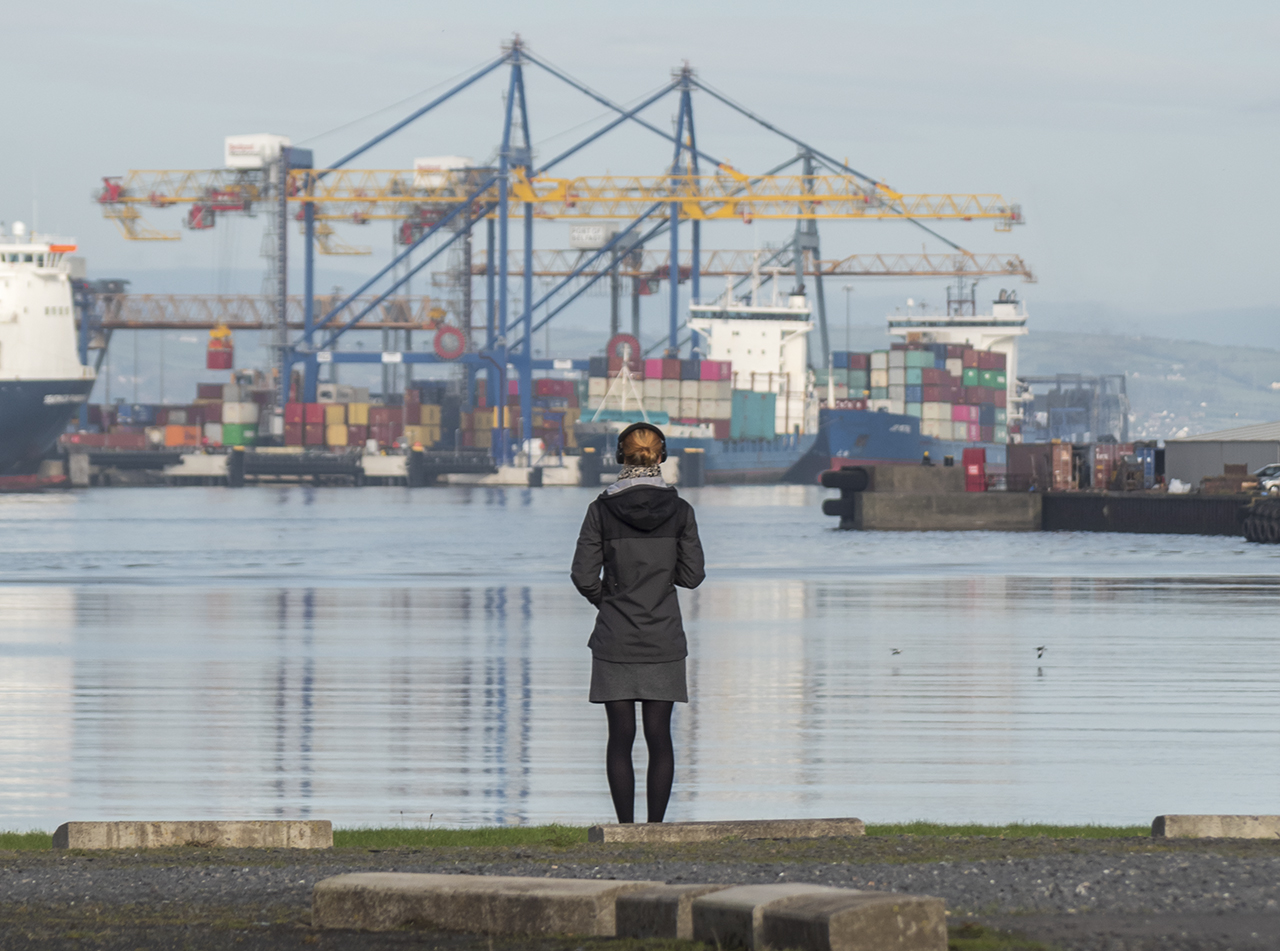
Belfast Harbour

In recent years, Belfast has embarked on several significant projects to stimulate economic growth and urban regeneration.

- Belfast Harbour Investment: In 2025, Belfast Harbour announced a £90 million investment to upgrade its port facilities to support offshore wind energy projects and accommodate cruise ships. This initiative was part of a broader £300 million plan that includes constructing hundreds of homes near the city center. The development aims to position Belfast as a hub for renewable energy and boost the local economy through increased tourism and housing.
- The Belfast Agenda 2024–2028: The Belfast City Council updated its strategic plan, focusing on sustainable and inclusive economic growth. Key objectives include increasing the number of homes by 6,000 units, building 400 social homes annually, and reducing the working-age economic inactivity rate from 23% to 18%.
- Neighbourhood Regeneration Fund (NRF): The NRF supports community-led capital projects across Belfast, aiming to enhance neighbourhood tourism, environmental sustainability, and the social economy. Projects funded include the restoration of historic buildings and the development of community hubs, contributing to the city's broader regeneration efforts.
- City Centre Living and Regeneration: Belfast aims to increase its population by 66,000 and add 31,600 homes by 2035. The appointment of GRAHAM as a delivery partner for a £630 million housing-led regeneration programme marks a significant step towards achieving these goals. The initiative focuses on developing sustainable, mixed-use communities in the city center.
- Belfast Region City Deal (BRCD): Signed in December 2021, the BRCD is a collaborative investment of over £850 million from central government and regional partners. It aims to create 20,000 new jobs and includes funding for tourism and regeneration projects, such as The Gobbins Phase 2 and the Mourne Mountains Gateway Project, enhancing Belfast's appeal as a tourist destination and stimulating economic growth.

== See also ==
- Economy of Northern Ireland
- Belfast
- Belfast City Centre
- Dublin-Belfast corridor
- Economy of Cork
- Economy of Dublin
- Economy of Limerick
