= National Spatial Strategy =

The National Spatial Strategy 2002-2020 was a twenty-year planning framework, with an aim of balancing social, economic and physical development in the Republic of Ireland.

== Gateways and hubs ==
The strategy seeks both to prevent the Greater Dublin Area becoming an area of problematic urban sprawl, and also to prevent rural areas becoming fragmented with scattered one-off housing. It seeks to do this by identifying various urban centres outside Dublin as focus points for concentrated development, drawing this away from both Dublin and the rural areas. The report describes two tiers of regional centres: a few larger "Gateways" with smaller "Hubs" as more local foci. When the NSS was being developed, William Thomas proposed a brand new city in the west of the country, gaining some news coverage.

There was controversy over the selection of the gateways and hubs, with towns not selected feeling aggrieved. A notable concept was the "Midland Gateway" comprising three of the larger towns in the midlands. The intention was a polycentric model with some inspiration from the Triangle Region Denmark. The inclusion in the plan of Derry, which is across the border in Northern Ireland, was a reflection of improved cross-border co-operation in the wake of the Northern Ireland peace process.

Gateways

- Cork
- Limerick—Shannon
- Galway
- Sligo
- Letterkenny—Derry
- Dundalk
- Dublin
- Tullamore—Athlone—Mullingar
- Waterford

Hubs

- Tralee and Killarney
- Mallow
- Ennis
- Tuam
- Castlebar and Ballina
- Monaghan
- Cavan
- Kilkenny
- Wexford
