= Mavis Arnold =

Irish feminist, journalist and psychotherapist (1937–2017)

Ysabel Mavis Arnold (née Cleave; 7 June 1937, Mussoorie, British India – 18 July 2017, Glenageary, Ireland) was an Irish feminist, journalist, psychotherapist and co-founder of the Women's Political Association. Known for the 1985 book Children of the Poor Clares, Arnold together with Heather Laskey were some of first to bring public attention to the systemic abuse carried out in industrial schools. Arnold was married to the English journalist and author Bruce Arnold.

== Bibliography ==
- Arnold, Mavis; Kirby, Peadar, eds. (1982). "The Abortion referendum" : the case against. Dublin: Anti-Amendment Campaign Committee.
- Arnold, Mavis; Laskey, Heather (1985). Children of the Poor Clares: The Collusion Between Church and State That Betrayed Thousands of Children in Ireland's Industrial Schools. Belfast: Appletree Press.
