= Economy of Limerick =

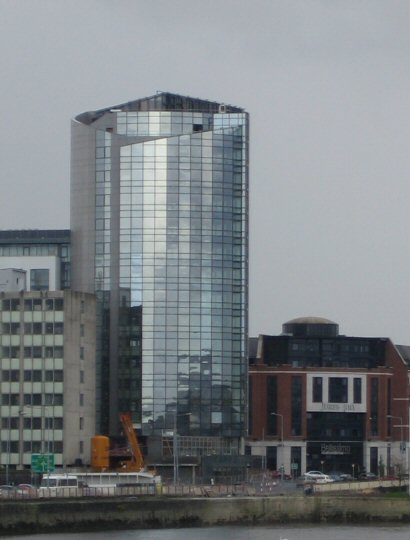
Riverpoint Building, Limerick

Limerick is the third largest city in the Republic of Ireland and is the capital of Ireland's Mid-West Region comprising the counties of Limerick, Clare and North Tipperary. Traditionally Limerick's economy was mainly agricultural of which a lot of industry in the city was based around due to the city's proximity to the Golden Vale. Important industries at this time were the bacon industry and Limerick lace which provided much employment. Limerick Port was also the main port on the west of Ireland where much of this produce was exported. Today Limerick's economy is driven by a cluster of industrial and business parks located along the Limerick/Shannon corridor which include the National Technology Park, Raheen Business Park and the Shannon Free Zone. Limerick/Shannon is also classified as a gateway city as part of the National Spatial Strategy.

== Statistics ==
County Clare, County Limerick and Tipperary as part of the Mid-West region with a population of 473,269 has a GVA of €16,448m (2016). According to the Central Statistics Office, in 2016, the region had a GDP per capita of €42,567.

Most of the industry in the Mid-West is concentrated around the Limerick urban area and the Shannon Free Zone, centred on the Limerick Suburban Rail network.

The main urban centers in the region are the Limerick urban area (108,067 inhabitants), then Ennis (29,840), Shannon (10,623), Nenagh (10,566), Thurles (8,352), Newcastle West (7,631).

Limerick is the second largest city in the province of Munster and Ireland's third largest city according to the 2022 census carried out by the CSO.

As of 2015, 14,500 people were working in 116 overseas companies in the area, including Dell, Vistakon (Johnson & Johnson), Cook Medical, Northern Trust, Lufthansa Technik, Optel Vision, Regeneron Pharmaceuticals, Element Six, Molex, WP Engine, ACI Worldwide, Edwards Lifesciences, General Motors, Becton Dickinson, Jaguar Land Rover, First Data, Intel, and GE Capital Services.

There are two main third-level institutions, University of Limerick and the Technological University of the Shannon which have a combined population of over 20,000 students.

== Shannon Free Zone ==
The Shannon Free Zone is a 600-acre (2.4 km^{2}) site in County Clare, located 15 minutes from Ennis and 20 minutes from Limerick city. Over 7,500 are employed in the business park, making it one of the biggest in the state and a huge employment hub in the region.

Companies located there include Avocent, GE Capital, Ingersoll Rand, Intel, Lufthansa Technik, Mentor Graphics, Molex, Shannon Aerospace, Shannon Engine Support, RSA Security and Veritas Software, Genworth, First Names Group, Pepper, and the IDA.

== Shannon Airport ==
Shannon Airport (IATA: SNN, ICAO: EINN) is the key piece of infrastructure in the region and is important for companies in the region to have easy access to other international markets by using the airport.

The airport is the 3rd busiest airport in the Republic of Ireland with 1.75 million passengers in 2017.

== Business parks ==
There are a number of IDA business parks in the Mid-West region, including the National Technology Park and Raheen Business Park in Limerick. In Ennis, a 30-acre (120,000 m^{2}) business park is currently under development and called Information Park Ennis.

=== Westpark Shannon ===
Westpark is a business park set on 40 acres of land in Shannon. The park has approximately 50 companies with 2,000 employees. The project has cost 65 million euro.

=== National Technology Park ===
The National Technology Park is located just outside Limerick city adjacent to the Dublin motorway and University of Limerick. It covers 300 hectares and hosts approximately 80 companies employing 3,000 people.

== Service industry ==
Limerick is the main retail center in the Mid-West. The Crescent Shopping Centre in Dooradoyle is the largest shopping center in Ireland outside of Dublin and the largest in Munster. The shopping Centre expanded in the early 2000s to become one of the largest in Ireland. There are also a number of other retail outlets in Limerick including the city centre.

== Infrastructure ==
Infrastrctural projects in the area include the Limerick Tunnel, which opened in 2010.

== See also ==
- Economy of Dublin
- Economy of Belfast
- Economy of Cork
