= The Right in Latin America: Elite Power, Hegemony and the Struggle for the State =

Book by Barry Cannon

- Author: Barry Cannon
- Language: English
- Genre: Politics, non-fiction
- Publisher: Routledge
- Publication date: 2016
- Media type: Hardcover
- Pages: 196
- ISBN: 9781135021825

The Right in Latin America: Elite Power, Hegemony and the Struggle for the State, a book written by Irish academic Barry Cannon, details the history of right-wing politics in Latin America. Utilizing elite theory and an interdisciplinary approach, the work examines how Latin American right-wing elites maintained power, despite threats from the pink tide of left-wing movements. Published at a time when the pink tide was waning, Cannon predicted the subsequent rise of the right during the conservative wave.

== Content ==
Cannon reviews the history of the Latin American elite attempting to seize total control of social power, saying that in the current dominant economic system of capitalism, elites utilized neoliberalism in an attempt to maintain control. In the book, it is explained that the right-wing movements in Latin America primarily serve economic elites.

Designations of the left and the right in Latin America are made in chapter two; the left views the state as a positive entity to promote equal outcomes while the right supports a free market over the state and supports equal opportunity. Citing The Sources of Social Power by Michael Mann, Cannon demonstrates that the elite in Latin America hold resources that prevent radical change that threatens their positions, proposing his own sources of power that include "economic, ideological, political, military, and transnational" networks. Cannon says that the international arena has been used by the elite due to the region's dependence on foreign investment.

In Chapter three, various right wing politicians are interviewed and mention their support of free market economics. Right-wing politicians from Argentina, Chile, Colombia and Venezuela show their clear support for neoliberalism, with the group promoting ideas of individual responsibility and distrust of the state. Cannon also shows how the right has different opinions on ethnic and sexual cultural issues.

Chapter four discusses how elites in Chile, Colombia, Mexico and Peru established a "right-oriented state/society complexes" that created neoliberal regimes. In these nations, Cannon details how such nations have little state control, have solidified media ownership and have collaborated with the United States Department of Defense with their war on drugs. Cannon says that the group of nations, the elite have established regimes that defend their hegemony and has resulted with the prevention of policies to counter economic inequality.

The book also focuses on Latin America's break away from the neoliberal establishment during the pink tide and how the United States and right-wing groups responded, focusing on the threats perceived by the right and their reactions. Cannon uses a methodology in chapter five on how threatened the right-wing elites feel by governments proposing increased state control based on the Economic Freedom Index by conservative think tank, The Heritage Foundation. These indicators used by cannon suggest that the right-wing feels more vulnerable in Bolivia, Ecuador and Venezuela.

In the sixth chapter and final, Cannon focuses on the right's use of three different political strategies; elections, protests and illegal methods. The chapter focuses on political protests in Venezuela promoted by international media and the United States and regarding unconstitutional methods, he writes about the 2002 Venezuelan coup attempt, the 2009 Honduran coup d'état and the 2010 Ecuadorian crisis. Cannon says that right-wing groups that feel more threatened, like in Bolivia, Ecuador and Venezuela, were more likely to use more than one of the three political strategies he listed in order to counter their perceived threats.

== Reception ==
Reviews of the book said that the focus on the right-wing in Latin America was welcome due to previous academic focus primarily being placed on leftist movements in the region. In a review in the journal Revista CIDOB, Díaz writes that Cannon provided much-needed analysis of right-wing movements in Latin America since the analysis of leftist tides was already saturated, saying that the book gave "relevant inputs to review and continue expanding the debate on the backlash of the right in the region and the world." In the Journal of Latin American Studies, Bohoslavsky says "The Right in Latin America is an excellent book not just for its deft combining of sociological elite power theory and studies on right-wing parties but also for the impressive amount of data collected from numerous interviews in four countries, from press and think tank documents, and from statistical sources." Ruth in their review in Latin American Politics and Society writes that "the book provides a plethora of in-depth case information on the role of the media, the military, and transnational actors and their relationship to right-wing elites" and that Cannon's book is "useful for Latin Americanists interested in political economy and international relations, as well as party politics."

In 2016, the book was present in the Selection of 2016 Publications list by the Irish Research Council in their annual review.

== General references ==
- Polga-Hecimovich, John (16 October 2016). "Review - The Right in Latin America". E-International Relations.
- Rovira Kaltwasser, Cristóbal (November 2018). "The Right in Latin America. Elite Power, Hegemony and the Struggle for the State ‐ by Cannon, Barry". Bulletin of Latin American Research. 37 (5): 657–658. doi:10.1111/blar.12912. ISSN 0261-3050.
