= Peadar Kirby =

Peadar Kirby is an author and academic at the Department of Politics and Public Administration at the University of Limerick. Up to the academic year 2006/2007 he was a Senior Professor at the School of Law and Government, Dublin City University. He specialises in issues concerning Latin America. He is a fluent speaker of the Irish language. He was involved in the Centre for International Studies at Dublin City University. While there he gave lectures on 'Globalization: Global Political Economy', and 'Latin America: From colony to periphery.'

Kirby has published a number of books on the Economy of Ireland. He has also written on Latin America (including liberation theology), and is the author of a textbook on the subject (Introduction to Latin America: Twenty-First Century Challenges, 2003).

== Published works ==
Books by Peadar Kirby include:

- Karl Polanyi and the Contemporary Political Crisis: Transforming Market Society in the Era of Climate Change, Bloomsbury Academic, 2020
- Towards a Second Republic: Irish Politics after the Celtic Tiger with Mary Murphy, Pluto Press, 2011
- Celtic Tiger in Collapse: Explaining the Weaknesses of the Irish Model, Palgrave Macmillan, 2010
- Vulnerability and Violence: The Impact of Globalisation, Pluto Press, 2005.
- Introduction to Latin America: Twenty-first Century Challenges, SAGE Publications, 2003, ISBN 0-7619-7373-7.
- The Celtic Tiger in Distress: Growth with Inequality in Ireland, Palgrave Macmillan, 2002.
- Reinventing Ireland: Culture, Society and the Global Economy, Pluto Press, 2002.
- Rich and Poor: Perspectives on Tackling Inequality in Ireland, Oak Tree Press, in association with the Combat Poverty Agency, 2001.
- In the Shadow of the Tiger, DCU Press, 1998.
- Poverty Amid Plenty: World and Irish Development Reconsidered, Trocaire and Gill & Macmillan, 1997.
- Ireland and Latin America: Links and Lessons, Trócaire and Gill and Macmillan, 1992.
- Dialann ó Nicearagua, An Clóchomhar, 1990, OCLC 22888655.
- Has Ireland a Future?, Mercier Press, 1988.
- Is Irish Catholicism Dying?, Mercier Press, 1984.
- Arnold, Mavis; Kirby, Peadar, eds. (1982). "The Abortion referendum" : the case against. Dublin: Anti-Amendment Campaign Committee.
- Lessons in Liberation: The Church in Latin America, Dominican Publications, 1981.
