= Dublin–Belfast corridor =

Geographical area for planning in Ireland

Various settlements along the corridor.
Various settlements along the corridor.

The Dublin–Belfast corridor (population 3.3 million) is a term used to loosely describe a geographical area that encompasses the Republic of Ireland's capital city, Dublin, and Northern Ireland's capital city, Belfast. It is synonymous with the term Dublin Belfast Economic Corridor (DBEC). The area includes the smaller cities of Lisburn and Newry; major towns such as Drogheda and Dundalk; and the Dublin satellite suburb of Swords.

The term has been used in papers regarding planning strategies in the area, with the aim of capitalising on the expanding economies of both cities. Since the implementation of Brexit, the corridor exists inside the European Union on its Republic of Ireland side, and outside the European Union on its Northern Ireland side, but there is no so-called "hard border" between the two states.

== Economy ==
The main economic engines of the region are the Greater Dublin Area and the Belfast Metropolitan Area. Greater Dublin has a GDP of around €250 billion (2023) while Belfast Metropolitan Area has €43 billion (2022) giving a total regional GDP of nearly €300 billion.

== Transport and infrastructure ==
The main route linking the two cities is along the M1 and N1 in the Republic of Ireland and the A1 and M1 in Northern Ireland.

There is also the Enterprise train service connecting the two city regions.

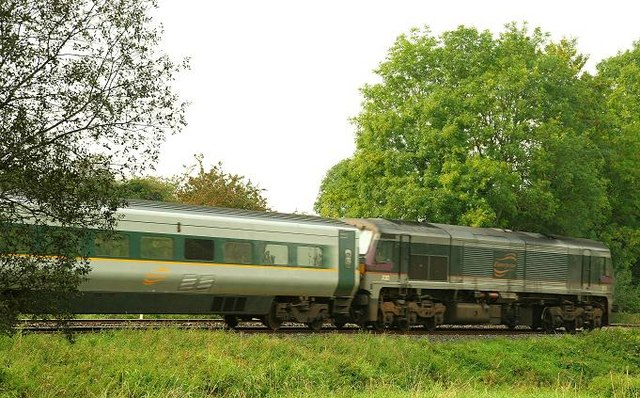
The "Enterprise" near Scarva, in County Armagh

There are three major airports: Dublin Airport (34.7 million passengers; 2024), Belfast International Airport (6.2 million passengers; 2019) and Belfast City Airport (2 million passengers; 2019) which together deal with over 42 million passengers each year.

For the two cities:

- Dublin is served by the Dublin Suburban Rail network, Dublin Bus network, Luas tram network, Dublin Area Rapid Transit and the planned MetroLink.
- Belfast is served by the Belfast Suburban Rail network, Metro (Belfast) bus service, the new Glider (Belfast) bus rapid transport system and some Ulsterbus services.

== See also ==
- Economy of Dublin
- Economy of Belfast
- Central belt Scotland (Glasgow-Edinburgh) (3.5m)
- Øresund Region
- Tricity Poland
- List of European city regions
