= Insolvency in Ireland =

The Insolvency Service of Ireland was established under the Personal Insolvency Act 2012. The service aims to provide mutually agreed debt solution to debtors and creditors in a fair, transparent and equitable manner. The service was established in Mar 2013. The service provides three solutions to avoid bankruptcy through "Personal Insolvency Practitioner" or "Approved Intermediaries". The service started accepted applications from debtors from 9 September 2013. Mr Lorcan O’Connor is the Director of the Insolvency Service of Ireland.

== Understanding Difference Between Insolvency and Bankruptcy ==
Insolvency is defined as the declared inability of a debtor to clear his debt. However, insolvency remains different from bankruptcy which explains a situation in which a debtor can't pay his / her debts due to having more liabilities than assets. Insolvency, if not addressed, can result in subsequent bankruptcy.

== Insolvency Law in Ireland - Personal Insolvency Act 2012 ==
Personal Insolvency Act of 2012 was promulgated into a law on 26 December 2012 and issues through a commencement order on 1 March 2013. The Act envisages the establishment of Insolvency Service of Ireland which is mandated to operate various resolution arrangements for debt, provided for under the Act.

Commencement Orders authorizes Insolvency Service of Ireland to engage professionals as intermediaries and personal insolvency practitioners, to facilitate debtors to accrue maximum benefits of the Act. The instant Act makes Insolvency Service of Ireland responsible for all matters concerning personal insolvency that include administration of new debt settlement procedures, authorization of intermediaries, and monitoring of the new procedures.

== Debt settlement procedure under the laws ==
The Insolvency process is initiated once a debtor contacts a Personal Insolvency Practitioner (PIP) or Approved Intermediary (AI) for a new arrangement. Once a debtor enters into an insolvency arrangement, 3 months protection from creditors is provided by the courts for finalizing a proposal for insolvency, with the help of PIP / AI that may be agreeable to both the borrower and the creditor. Furthermore, PIPs can be consulted without a final decision to undertake a procedure.

== Debt Settlement Options ==
Depending on the person's level of debt and type of debt (secured / unsecured), Insolvency Service of Ireland's three proposed mechanisms are summarized below:

- Arrangement through a Debt Relief Notice (DRN) which allows write off of generally unsecured debt of up to €20,000, under a 3-year supervision period.
- Settlement through a Debt Settlement Arrangement (DSA) for the settlement of debt (unsecured) with no maximum limits, normally over a period of 5 years.
- Conclusion through a Personal Insolvency Arrangement (PIA) to ensure an agreed settlement of secured debt for up to €3 million (extendable) and unsecured debt (no limits), normally over a period of 6 years.

The Personal Insolvency Act also provides automatic discharge from bankruptcy (subject to conditions) after 3 years as against current limit of 12 years.

== Calculation of Reasonable Living Expenses ==
While calculating monthly amount of debt repayments that a debtor can afford, Insolvency Service of Ireland provides guidelines for calculating the expenses needed to maintain a reasonable standard of living.

The guidelines allow for a monthly expenditure of €900.08 (where no car is needed ) or €1029.83 if they need a car(in rural areas) for a single adult, while not including housing costs (Rent or Mortgage). There guidelines also allow flexibility for a debtor for costs arising due to ill-health or disability.

== Protection Against Misdeclaration ==
Insolvency Service Of Ireland provides 4 tier protection against misdeclaration by debtors through a statutory declaration of truth, complete documentation, a verification by Insolvency Service of Ireland and that of legal action in the court of law.

== Personal insolvency practitioners ==
The practitioners working for the Act are generally accountants with requisite experience in the insolvency. After completion of recommended course, Insolvency Service of Ireland registers the practitioners.

== Insolvency Agreements in UK ==
Insolvency services are already in place in the UK. Although Act has many similarities to the UK system, however it also deals with mortgages – an aspect that is missing in the UK system.
