= Shannon LNG =

Shannon LNG is a project that proposes to develop a liquefied natural gas receiving terminal on the Shannon Estuary near Ballylongford and Tarbert in County Kerry.

== Project ==
The site was originally owned by Shannon Development who have been courting a development for the site for many years owing to its sheltered location. In 2002, the natural gas Pipeline to The West was completed, crossing the Shannon 25 km from the site of the proposed terminal.

The project, the first LNG terminal in Ireland, is expected to cost €500 million. It will contain four insulated storage tanks of 200,000 cubic metres capacity and a regassification facility linked to the gas transmission system.

== Planning and safety ==
As the project qualifies as strategic infrastructure under the Planning and Development (Strategic Infrastructure) Act 2006 and, consequently An Bord Pleanála and not Kerry County Council was the Planning Authority. The Kilcolgan Residents' Association and the Friends of the Irish Environment have lodged application for a judicial review of An Bord Pleanála's decision to approve the project on safety and environmental grounds.

In Ireland, development consent is divided among different statutory bodies. In order to obtain full development consent Shannon LNG requires an Integrated Pollution Prevention Control Licence (IPPC) from the Environmental Protection Agency (EPA) and a Foreshore Licence from the Department of the Environment for the construction of the marine aspects of the project.

In January 2010, the European Commission, in an interim finding, declared that the rezoning of the land for the proposed LNG terminal from 'Rural General' and 'Secondary Special Amenity' should have been subjected to a Strategic Environmental Assessment (SEA) as per the EU SEA Directive. The EU Parliament Petitions Committee stated:

"The Commission is also concerned by the discrepancy in the approach of the Irish authorities in dealing with the development under fast track legislation for 'strategic projects' whilst not requiring an SEA. [...] On the basis of the further information provided, the Commission has decided to raise the above-mentioned issues with the Irish authorities".

On 29 November 2011, a major controversy was highlighted when the Irish Energy Minister announced in Parliament that the coming on stream of Shannon LNG in Ireland would lead to gas prices rising instead of falling.

Minister Pat Rabbitte told the Dáil:

"The model is based on Irish prices following United Kingdom prices plus an additional amount for the price of transport through the interconnectors. In an environment in which gas from the Corrib field and LNG meet some or all of Irish demand, the interconnectors built and owned by Bord Gáis Éireann would become under utilised and their proper remuneration by the reduced number of gas customers becomes an issue. In such circumstances, the prices for the consumer would go up and there would be a windfall gain for the multinationals. Deputy Ferris is likely to be minded to agree with me that this is not the outcome we seek. We have no wish for prices to be pushed up as a result of a stranded asset, that is, the interconnector, and a windfall profit to the multinationals, much as we welcome them here, whether they are associated with Corrib or LNG."

Shannon LNG, in reaction, has referred the dispute with the Irish Commission for Regulation of Utilities (CRU) over a proposed interconnector tariff to the European Commission.

Gordon Shearer, CEO of HESS LNG stated that the tariff not only contravened EU law but represented a massive policy shift from the previous government's stance on interconnector policy.

In July 2014, media reports indicated the project had finally been abandoned and the company website was taken offline. In 2016 Hess sold Shannon LNG. In 2018 it was revealed that it had been purchased by New Fortress Energy, a unit of Fortress Investment Group.

In 2025 plans for the project were reactivated, with proposals for a €650m terminal going to An Bórd Pleanála.

== Controversy ==
The project has been the subject of sustained pressure from environmental activists who object to the project on the grounds that LNG has a high emissions profile and health risks.
