= Economy of Dublin =

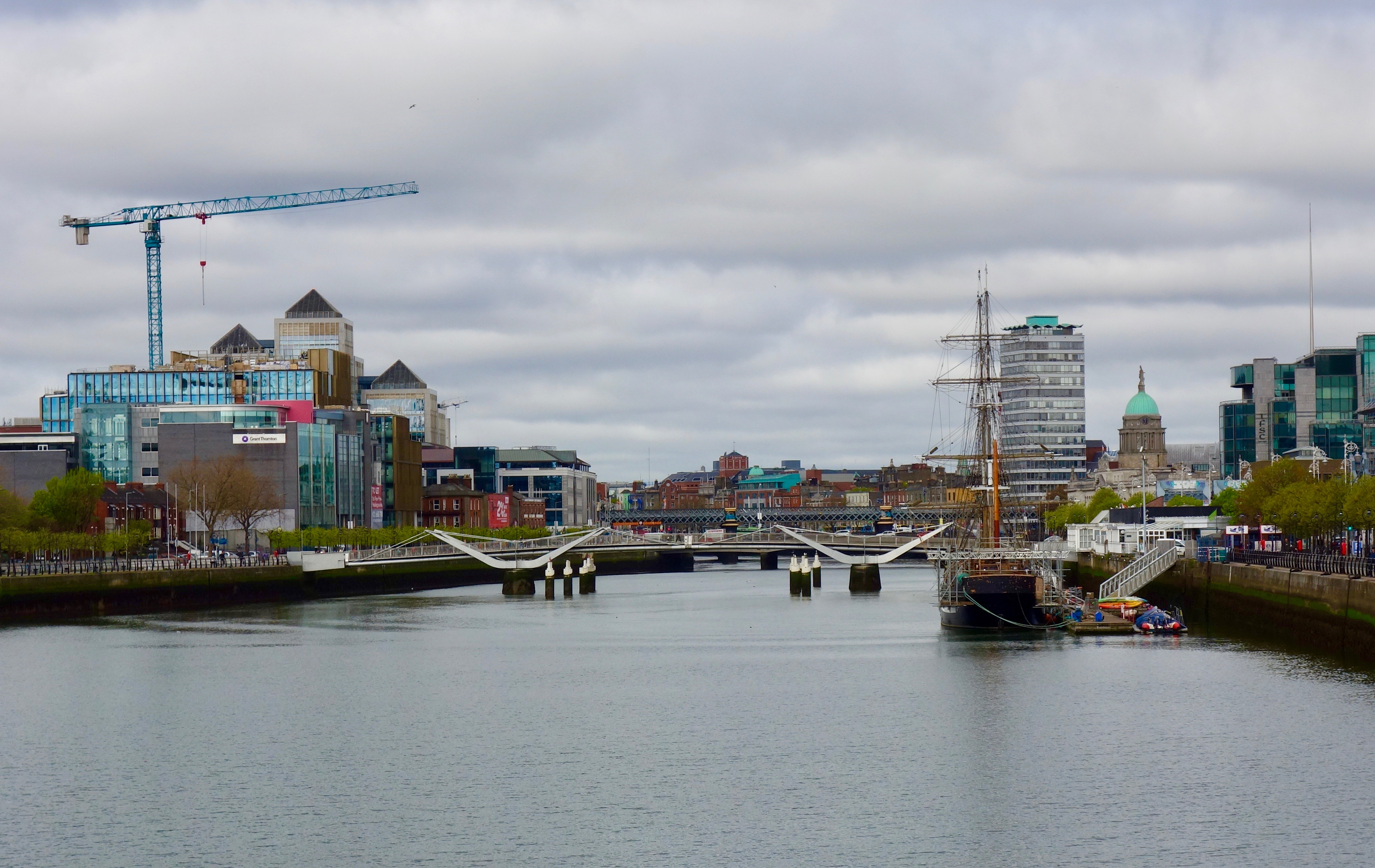
Dublin's city centre from Samuel Beckett Bridge

Dublin is the largest city and capital of Ireland, and is the country's economic hub. As well as being the location of the national parliament and most of the civil service, Dublin is also the focal point of media in the country. Much of Ireland's transportation network radiates from the city, and Dublin Port is responsible for a large proportion of Ireland's import and export trade.

Dublin is home to a number of multinational corporations, including in "hi tech" sectors such as information technology, digital media, financial services and the pharmaceutical industry. Dublin is also the location of the headquarters of several large Irish public companies including Bank of Ireland, DCC plc, AIB Group, Ardagh Group, CRH plc, Ryanair, Smurfit Kappa and Flutter Entertainment (formerly Paddy Power Betfair). Many of Ireland's public sector and state owned employers are based in Dublin including utility companies such as ESB Group, educational institutions such as Trinity College Dublin, University College Dublin, Dublin City University and Technological University Dublin and most of Ireland's higher courts, RTÉ (Irelands national public service broadcaster), and several teaching hospitals. Other employers service the tourism and retail markets.

== Analysis ==
=== Rankings ===
In 2017 Dublin ranked 1st in Ireland by disposable income per person, at 110% of the State average.

In 2008, it was the city with the 2nd highest wages in the world, dropping to 10th place in 2009, and, according to a Brookings Institution report in 2012, had the 14th highest income per capita in the world at $55,578 (€42,960).

As of 2011, Mercer's 2011 Worldwide Cost of Living Survey listed Dublin as the 13th most expensive city in the European Union (down from 10th in 2010), and the 58th most expensive place to live in the world (down from 42nd in 2010). Similar surveys of ex-pats in 2015 and 2017 ranked the city as the 49th and 47th most expensive city respectively.

=== GDP ===
According to 2023 figures, the GDP of the Dublin Region was approximately €248.3 billion ($271.5 billion), representing over 40% of Irish GDP, and ranking 3rd among European metropolitan areas by Gross metropolitan product.

According to 2025 figures, Dublin had a GDP per capita of $115,000, making it the richest city in Europe by GDP per capita.

=== Other indicators ===
Dublin was at the centre of Ireland's rapid economic growth from 1995 to 2007 when both the standards and the cost of living in the city rose dramatically. By 2018, the Economic and Social Research Institute reported that the concentration of population and economic activity in Dublin (accounting for approximately 50% of all economic activity in the country) was "unsustainable". The Irish Times also queried whether the lack of available rental accommodation in the capital would impact Dublin's economic growth.

== Government ==
Dublin is the capital of Ireland, and many of the jobs in the Irish Civil Service are based in the central Dublin 1 and Dublin 2 postal districts.

In 1994, County Dublin, which excluded the city, was divided into three local government areas: Dún Laoghaire–Rathdown, South Dublin and Fingal.

== Transport ==
=== Canals and ports ===
Ireland's two longest canals, the Royal Canal and the Grand Canal, meet in Dublin Bay. The Irish railway system radiates from Dublin run by Irish Rail. Similarly, a number of routes in the Irish road system spread outwards from Dublin. Dublin Port is Ireland's largest port facility. The port of Dún Laoghaire is also located within the county.

=== Dublin Airport ===
Dublin Airport is the biggest and busiest in Ireland, with two terminals, handling almost 33 million passengers annually (as of 2019). The Irish airlines Aer Lingus, CityJet and Ryanair have their own head offices in Dublin.

=== Rail ===
Heuston and Connolly stations are the two main railway stations in Dublin. Operated by Iarnród Éireann, the Dublin Suburban Rail network consists of five railway lines serving the Greater Dublin Area and commuter towns such as Drogheda and Dundalk in County Louth. One of these lines is the electrified Dublin Area Rapid Transit (DART) line, which runs primarily along the coast from Malahide and Howth southwards as far as Greystones. Commuter rail operates on the other four lines using Irish Rail diesel multiple units. In 2016, passengers journeys for DART and Dublin Suburban lines were nearly 19 million and 11.9 million, respectively (around 64% of all Irish Rail passengers).

The Luas is an electrified light rail system which has been operating since 2004 and carried over 47 million passengers annually (as of 2024). The network consists of two tram lines; the Red Line links the Docklands and city centre with the south-western suburbs, while the Green Line connects the city centre with suburbs to the south of the city.

== Economic sectors ==
As of mid-2017, approximately 874,400 people were employed in the Greater Dublin Area (which includes counties Meath, Kildare and Wicklow). Around 60% of people who are employed in Ireland's financial, Information and Communications Technology (ICT), and professional services sectors are located in this area.

=== Media ===
Dublin is home to a number of national newspapers, radio stations, television stations and telephone companies. RTÉ is Ireland's national state broadcaster, and is based in Donnybrook. Virgin Media One, MTV Ireland and Sky News are also based in the city. The headquarters of An Post and telecommunications companies such as Eir, as well as mobile operators Meteor, Vodafone and 3 are all located in the Dublin area. Dublin is also the headquarters of national newspapers such as The Irish Times, Irish Independent and The Herald.

=== Food and drink ===
One of Ireland's most widely known alcoholic drinks, Guinness, has been brewed at the St. James's Gate Brewery since 1759. Dublin also profited from the role of the beef industry.

=== Information and communications technology ===
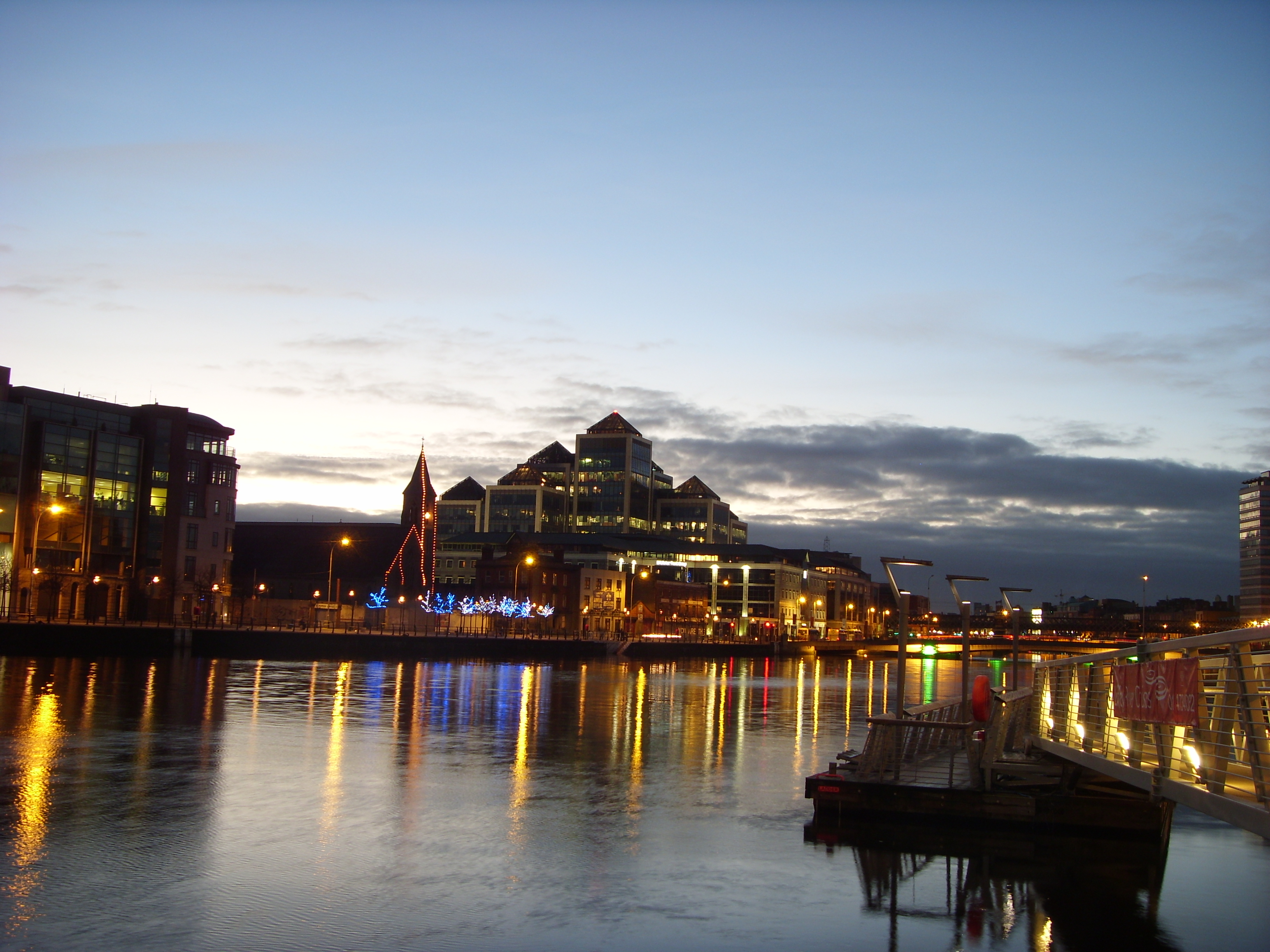
One George's Quay Plaza at night (middle)

A number of IT companies are located in the city, including in the south inner area of Dublin 2, and the adjacent counties. Among these are Amazon, eBay, Dell, Facebook, Zynga, Dropbox, LinkedIn, Indeed, Twitter, Google, EMC, Microsoft, Oracle, PayPal, SAP, Symantec, and Yahoo!. A number of these organisations have premises in the Silicon Docks area of the city.

The area surrounding Ireland's capital city has the largest concentration of large-scale data centre operations in the country, including global operations run by Google, Microsoft and Amazon. Companies involved in the cloud computing sector include Citrix, EMC2, Dropbox, Salesforce and Zendesk.

=== Financial ===
In 2017 and 2018 respectively, Dublin was ranked 5th in Europe and 31st globally in the Global Financial Centres Index (GFCI). Many of the jobs in Dublin's financial services sector are based at the International Financial Services Centre in the Dublin Docklands area. Also located in Dublin is the Irish Stock Exchange (ISEQ).

=== Retail ===
Ireland's largest retail and shopping centres are located in the Dublin area, including Dundrum Town Centre (140,000 square metres, 160 stores) and Blanchardstown Centre (120,000 square metres, 180 stores). Within the city centre, the "prime retail streets" include Henry Street and Grafton Street. A 2013 report, for Ibec and Retail Ireland, indicated that Dublin was the "main national hub of retail activity", accounting for 25% of the country's retail entities, and approximately 50% of national employment in the sector.

=== Tourism ===
Several of Ireland's most visited tourist attractions are in the Dublin area, including the Guinness Storehouse (nearly 1.8 million visitors in 2017), Dublin Zoo (1.2m visitors in 2017), and the National Gallery of Ireland (more than 1 million visitors). As of 2016, Dublin attracted over 5.6 million overseas visitors, generating over €1.9 in revenue.

== Higher education ==
Higher education institutions contributed €10.6 billion to the national economy in 2011. This included nearly €1 billion from international students, where 57% of these international students are based in the Dublin region. As a university city, several of the largest universities and colleges are located in the capital, including the largest (University College Dublin – UCD), and one of the oldest (Trinity College Dublin). A 2014 study indicated that the three universities in Dublin (Dublin City University, Trinity College, and UCD) were among the top institutions for economic impact nationally.

== See also ==
- Dublin-Belfast corridor
- Transport in Dublin
- Economy of Cork
- Economy of Belfast
- Economy of Limerick
