= Forfás =

Former State Agency of the Department of Enterprise, Trade and Employment overview
- Formed: January 1994
- Dissolved: 1 August 2014
- Superseding Former State Agency of the Department of Enterprise, Trade and Employment: Department of Enterprise, Trade and Employment
- Jurisdiction: Ireland
- Headquarters: Wilton Park House, Wilton Place, Dublin 2
- Employees: 90
- Former State Agency of the Department of Enterprise, Trade and Employment executive: Chief Executive; Chairman
- Key documents: Industrial Development Act, 1993; Industrial Development (Forfás Dissolution) Act, 2014
- Website: Forfás website

Forfás (Irish pronunciation: [ˈfˠɔɾˠfˠaːsˠ]) was the national policy advisory board for enterprise, trade, science, technology and innovation in Ireland. The agency was established in January 1994 under the Industrial Development Act, 1993 and was run by a board appointed by the Minister for Enterprise, Trade and Employment, to whom the agency was responsible. Forfás was dissolved on 1 August 2014 and its functions were transferred to the Department of Enterprise, Trade and Employment, Enterprise Ireland, the Industrial Development Authority and the Health and Safety Authority.

== Functions ==
Legally, Forfás had five separate but related functions. It

- Provided independent and rigorous research, advice and support in the areas of enterprise and science policy. This work informed the Department of Enterprise, Trade and Employment and wider Government in its responses to the fast-changing needs of the global business environment;
- Ensured the coherence of policies across the development agencies supporting enterprise;
- Evaluated enterprise policy interventions;
- Provided research and administrative support to independent advisory groups which currently include the:
  - Advisory Council for Science, Technology and Innovation (ASC)
  - Expert Group on Future Skills Needs (EGFSN)
  - Management Development Council (MDC)
  - National Competitiveness Council (NCC)

In its day-to-day business, the primary function of Forfás was to analyse developments in areas concerning Ireland's industrial and economic development and to make policy recommendations based on this analysis to Government. The Irish Government was not obliged to implement any recommendations that Forfás made. Additional functions included:

- Accreditation services of the Irish National Accreditation Board (INAB). INAB provides services for the accreditation of calibration and testing laboratories in Ireland.
- Managing the national awareness programme, Discover Science and Engineering (DSE). DSE is the national science awareness programme for science, engineering, technology and innovation. The programme was managed by Forfás on behalf of the Department of Enterprise, Trade and Employment.
- Provision of certain shared corporate services for IDA Ireland, Enterprise Ireland and Science Foundation Ireland;
- Hosting the Office of the Chief Scientific Adviser to Government.

As outlined above, Forfás also played a significant role in co-ordinating the activities of Government Enterprise Agencies (Enterprise Ireland, IDA Ireland and Science Foundation Ireland).

== Governance ==
=== Board ===
Forfás was ultimately a board of members that advised the Government. Members were appointed to the Board of Forfás by the Minister for Enterprise, Trade and Employment and as provided for in the Industrial Development legislation. Under the Industrial Development Act 1993, the CEOs of IDA Ireland, Enterprise Ireland and Science Foundation Ireland were automatically board members of Forfás. By tradition, the Director General of FÁS and the Secretary General of the Department of Enterprise, Trade and Employment were also board members. The Board also included a panel of business, economic, and other specialists.

=== Executive ===
While Forfás was a board, that board was supported by an executive of salaried employees. Forfás was the sole legal employer of staff in its own executive, Enterprise Ireland, IDA Ireland and Science Foundation Ireland. Arising out of this, all staff employed in these bodies were Forfás employees on secondment. Upon their retirement, Forfás assumed responsibility for their pension, resulting in Forfás having a large annual pensions cost and a significant liability under accounting standard FRS 17.

== Policy analysis and advice ==
Forfás fulfilled its mandate through three policy divisions:

- Competitiveness Division
- Enterprise Policy Division
- Science, Technology & Human Capital Division

=== Competitiveness ===
The Competitiveness Division supported the Board of Forfás in providing advice to the Minister for Enterprise, Trade and Employment, the development agencies and other government departments. It had the following departments:

- National Competitiveness, Sustainability and Infrastructure Department
- Regulation, Trade and Policy Foresight Department
- Finance Department
- Systems/IT/Facilities Departments

=== Enterprise policy ===
The Enterprise policy departments of this division supported the Board of Forfás in providing advice to the Minister for Enterprise, Trade and Employment on general enterprise development and related issues: It had the following three departments:

- Enterprise Policy and Communications Department
- Tax/Finance/Employment and Surveys Department
- Discover Science and Engineering

=== Science, Technology & Human Capital ===
This Division supported the Board of Forfás in providing advice to the Minister for Enterprise, Trade and Employment on the development and implementation of science, technology, innovation and human capital policy for economic and social well-being. The division also provided research and secretariat support to the Advisory Science Council, the Expert Group on Future Skills Needs and the Management Development Council. It was made up of the following departments:

- Science, Technology and Basic Research Policy
- Enterprise Research and Development Policy
- Human Capital and Labour Market Policy

== Secretariat support ==
Forfás provided the secretariat to a number of committees established by Government. These include:

- Advisory Council on Science & Technology in Ireland (ACSTI)
- Expert Group on Future Skills Needs (EGFSN)
- National Competitiveness Council (NCC)
- Management Development Council (MDC)

Forfás also provided support to the Enterprise Strategy Group, the Small Business Forum, the Business Regulation Forum and the Consumer Strategy Group.

== Discover Science and Engineering ==
It also ran the Discover Science & Engineering (DSE) programme on behalf of the Office of Science & Technology. The programme bring together under one brand many of the existing national science, technology and engineering awareness activities and expands on these activities in a way that eliminates duplication and provides a more focused and effective communications strategy. The aim of the DSE programme is to encourage young people to consider careers in science, engineering and technology and, linked to that, to increase the numbers of students studying the physical sciences. In addition, the programme aims to raise the level of perception of science, technology, innovation and engineering among students and society in general. DSE runs numerous initiatives, including Science Week Ireland, Discover Primary Science, Greenwave and Science.ie.

== Irish National Accreditation Board ==
The Irish National Accreditation Board (INAB) has three main functions. It:

- Accredited organisations involved in the certification of quality and environmental management systems, products and personnel, laboratories involved in calibration and testing activities, certification and inspection bodies, attesters and attestation bodies
- Responsible for accreditation in accordance with the relevant International Organization for Standardization ISO 17000 series of standards and guides and the harmonised EN 45000 series of European standards
- Is the national statutory monitoring authority for GLP (Good Laboratory Practice) and EMAS (European Eco-Management and Audit Schemes)

== Other activities ==
Forfás was responsible for the successful EMU Business Awareness Campaign in Ireland and related Loughrea Eurotown project and more recently, the Enterprise Strategy Group and the Consumer Strategy Group.

Forfás was the direct employer of all employees in the 'development agencies', including IDA Ireland, Enterprise Ireland, Science Foundation Ireland and also was the legal employer of the Chief Scientific Adviser to the Irish Government.

== Chairman of Forfás ==
#	Name	Appointed	Retired
1.	Tom Toner	1994	1999
2.	Peter Cassells	2000	2004
3.	Eoin O'Driscoll	2004	2014

== Chief Executives of Forfás ==
#	Name	Appointed	Retired
1.	John Travers	1994	2002
2.	Martin Cronin	2002	2010
3.	Martin Shanahan	2010	2014

== See also ==
- IDA Ireland
- Enterprise Ireland
- National Competitiveness Council
- Science Foundation Ireland
- Discover Science & Engineering
