= Sentinus =

Northern Irish educational charity

- Formation: 23 March 1987
- Founder: Gordon Topping
- Type: Charitable organisation
- Registration no.: NI102064
- Legal status: Non-profit
- Purpose: STEM
- Location: Lisburn
- Region served: Northern Ireland
- Website: Official Site
- Formerly called: Industry Matters (Northern Ireland) (1987-2001)

Sentinus is an educational charity based in Lisburn, Northern Ireland that provides educational programs for young people interested in science, technology, engineering and mathematics (STEM).

== History ==
Northern Ireland produces around 2,000 qualified IT workers each year; there are around 16,000 IT jobs in the Northern Ireland economy.

== Function ==
It works with EngineeringUK and the Council for the Curriculum, Examinations & Assessment (CCEA). It works with primary and secondary schools in Northern Ireland.

It runs summer placements for IT workshops for those of sixth form age (16-18). It offers Robotics Roadshows for primary school children.

== Sentinus Young Innovators ==
Sentinus hosts the annual Big Bang Northern Ireland Fair which incorporates Sentinus Young Innovators. This is a one day science and engineering project exhibition for post-primary students. It is one of largest such events in the United Kingdom. In 2019 over 3,000 students participated from 130 schools across both Northern Ireland and the Republic of Ireland.

The competition is affiliated with the International Science and Engineering Fair (ISEF) and the Broadcom MASTERS program. The overall winner represents Northern Ireland at the following year's ISEF.

=== Past Overall Winners ===
Year	Name	School	Project Title	Notes
2019	Cleo Gallen & Zainab Shahid	Loreto Secondary School Balbriggan		Second time this school won
2018	Richard Beattie & Dylan Bagnall	The King's Hospital	Identifying Bats from the Roost using an Inexpensive Raspberry Pi Bat Detector & PCR	Awarded Best of Category and First Place in the Animal Sciences Category and the China Association for Science and Technology Award at 2019 Intel ISEF
2017	Niamh Ann Kelly	Our Lady's College, Greenhills	The Antimicrobial Potential of Tree Bark Extracts	Awarded Third Place in the Plants Sciences Category at 2018 Intel ISEF Second time this school won
2016	Gareth Reid	Grosvenor Grammar School	Gaze	Awarded Third Place in the Engineering Mechanics Category & SPIE Special Award at 2017 Intel ISEF Second time this school won
2015	Lauren Murphy	Loreto Secondary School Balbriggan	A Rehabilitation Aid for the Treatment of ‘Clenched Fist	Awarded Third Place in the Computational Biology and Bioinformatics Category at 2016 Intel ISEF
2014	Anna McEvoy	Our Lady's College, Greenhills	Aetiology of bleeding canker disease of Horse Chestnut trees	Awarded Second Place in the Plant Sciences category and the Monsanto First Award for Innovation in Plant Science at 2015 Intel ISEF
2013	John Neill	Down High School	Fone2Find	Youngest Winner of the Competition
2012	Myles Mitchell	Limavady Grammar School	Misbehaving Waves – The Surreal Thing	Awarded first prize from the Acoustical Society of America and a second prize from the Society of Exploration Geophysicists at Intel ISEF 2013
2011	Henrik Bruesecke	St Columba’s Comprehensive School		Awarded Fourth Place in the Category of Computer Science & Second prize from the Institute of Electrical and Electronics Engineers at 2012 Intel ISEF
2010	David McCarroll & Jonathan McEwan	South Eastern Regional College	Voice Activated Alarm	Highly Commended at 2011 Intel ISEF
2005	Caron Malone, Barbara Fleming & Daniel Evans	Rathmore Grammar School		
2004	Peter Kirkland	Dalriada School		Awarded First Place in Engineering at 2005 Intel ISEF
2003	Fergal Garvey & Darran Treanor	Abbey Christian Brothers' Grammar School	Colonial Behaviour in sea anemones	Awarded Fourth Place in Category and Third Place in Northern American Benthological Society Award at 2004 Intel ISEF
2002	Patrick Corbett	St Patrick's College, Maghera		Awarded Second Place Grand Award in Engineering at 2003 Intel ISEF
2000	Sharon Matchett	Grosvenor Grammar School	Maternity Seat Belt	Awarded Fourth Place in her Category at 2001 Intel ISEF
1999	Conor Higgins, Elizabeth Crawford & Angela Wilson	Hazelwood College		Awarded Second Place in the Environmental Science Category at 2000 Intel ISEF
1998	Ravi Sumra	Foyle and Londonderry College	Sinker Sorting Device	Awarded First Place in the Engineering Category at 1999 Intel ISEF Inaugural Winner

== See also ==
- Discover Science & Engineering, equivalent in the Republic of Ireland
- Science Week Ireland
- The Big Bang Fair
- Young Scientist and Technology Exhibition
