= State agencies of the Republic of Ireland =

State agencies or non-commercial state agencies in Ireland

State Agencies or Non-Commercial State Agencies in Ireland are public sector bodies of the state that have a statutory obligation to perform specific tasks on behalf of the Government of Ireland. Such agencies are considered "arm's length" bodies as they are largely isolated from the workings of central government. The state agencies are distinct and separate from the Civil Service. As of Q3, 2016 approximately 12,616 public sector workers are employed in NCSAs.

== Department of Agriculture, Food and the Marine ==
- Bord Bia
- Bord Iascaigh Mhara
- Marine Institute Ireland
- National Milk Agency
- Sea Fisheries Protection Authority
- Teagasc

== Department of Children, Disability and Equality ==
- The Adoption Authority
- Centre for Young Offenders
- Child and Family Agency
- Irish Human Rights and Equality Commission
- Office of the Ombudsman for Children
- National Disability Authority

== Department of Climate, Energy and the Environment ==
- Commission for Regulation of Utilities
- Digital Hub Development Authority
- Environmental Protection Agency
- Foyle, Carlingford and Irish Lights Commission (Note: This agency is a North South Implementation body — it is partially funded by the Government of the Republic of Ireland, and partially by the Government of Northern Ireland.)
- Inland Fisheries Ireland
- Maritime Area Regulatory Authority
- National Oil Reserve Agency
- Sustainable Energy Authority of Ireland
- Irish Water Safety (Note: Formally a registered charity, but receives government funding)

== Department of Culture, Communications and Sport ==
- Arts Council
- Coimisiún na Meán
- Commission for Communications Regulation
- Chester Beatty Library
- Crawford Art Gallery
- Fís Éireann/Screen Ireland
- Irish Museum of Modern Art
- National Concert Hall
- National Library of Ireland
- National Museum of Ireland
- Sport Ireland

== Department of Education and Youth ==
- Educational Research Centre
- National Council for Special Education
- PDST Technology in Education
- Caranua / Residential Institutions Statutory Fund
- Teaching Council of Ireland

== Department of Enterprise, Tourism and Employment ==
- Fáilte Ireland
- Tourism Ireland
- Competition and Consumer Protection Commission
- Enterprise Ireland
- Health and Safety Authority
- IDA Ireland
- Interreg
- InterTradeIreland
- Irish Auditing and Accounting Supervisory Authority
- National Standards Authority of Ireland
- Personal Injuries Resolution Board
- Intellectual Property Office of Ireland

== Department of Further and Higher Education, Research, Innovation and Science ==
- Grangegorman Development Agency
- Higher Education Authority
- Taighde Éireann Research Ireland
- Quality and Qualifications Ireland
- SOLAS

== Department of Health ==
- Irish Dental Council
- Food Safety Authority of Ireland
- Safefood
- Health & Social Care Professionals Council
- Health Information and Quality Authority
- Health Insurance Authority
- Health Products Regulatory Authority
- Health Research Board
- Health Service Executive
- Irish Blood Transfusion Service
- Irish Mental Health Commission
- Medical Council of Ireland
- National Cancer Registry Ireland
- National Paediatric Hospital Development Board
- National Treatment Purchase Fund
- Nursing and Midwifery Board of Ireland
- Pharmaceutical Society of Ireland
- Pre-Hospital Emergency Care Council

== Department of Housing, Local Government and Heritage ==
- An Coimisiún Pleanála
- Dublin Docklands Development Authority
- Electoral Commission
- Heritage Council
- Housing Agency
- Housing Finance Agency
- Local Government Management Agency
- Residential Tenancies Board
- Tailte Éireann
- Waterways Ireland

== Department of Justice, Home Affairs and Migration ==
- Fiosrú – the Office of the Police Ombudsman
- Garda Síochána
- Irish Film Classification Office
- Irish Prison Service
- Law Reform Commission (Note: The Law Reform Commission is an independent statutory body, but maintains "ongoing contact" with the Department of Justice.)

== Department of Public Expenditure, Infrastructure, Public Service Reform and Digitalisation ==
- Special EU Programmes Body (Note: This agency is a North South Implementation body — it is partially funded by the Government of the Republic of Ireland, and partially by the Government of Northern Ireland.)

== Department of Rural and Community Development and the Gaeltacht ==
- Foras na Gaeilge
- Pobal
- Ulster-Scots Agency
- Údarás na Gaeltachta
- Western Development Commission

== Department of Social Protection ==
- Citizens Information Board
- Pensions Authority

== Department of the Taoiseach ==
- National Economic and Social Council

== Department of Transport ==
- Medical Bureau of Road Safety
- Commission for Railway Regulation
- Irish Aviation Authority
  - Air Accident Investigation Unit
  - Commission for Aviation Regulation
- Iarnród Éireann
- daa plc
- National Transport Authority
- Commission for Railway Regulation
  - Railway Accident Investigation Unit
- Road Safety Authority
- Transport Infrastructure Ireland
