= Advertising Standards Authority (Ireland) =

- Organisation's logo
- Abbreviation: ASA
- Formation: 1981
- Type: NGO
- Purpose: Advertising Regulator
- Headquarters: 7 Herbert Street
- Location: Dublin 2
- Region served: Ireland
- Chair: Miriam Hughes
- Chief Executive: Orla Twomey
- Affiliations: European Advertising Standards Alliance
- Website: adstandards.ie
- Formerly called: Advertising Standards Authority For Ireland

The Advertising Standards Authority (ASA), previously known as the Advertising Standards Authority for Ireland, is the self-regulatory organisation (SRO) for advertising industry in Ireland. The 7th edition of its Code was introduced with effect from March 2016. Some of the activities that the organization engages in are:

- Policy and Advocacy
- Knowledge Sharing
- Ad Monitoring
- Ad Complaint Management
- Providing Copy Advice
- Setting the Advertising Code

In October 2023, the Advertising Standards Authority and the Competition and Consumer Protection Commission (CCPC) issued fresh guidance for Irish Influencers on the clear labelling of ads on social media.

== History ==
The Advertising Standards Authority was established in 1981 and substantially restructured in 1988 at the request of the Director of Consumer Affairs, to place the complaints handling at arm's length from the industry representation.

In 2018, the Advertising Standards Authority for the first time upheld a complaint against a blogger, for consumer-generated advertising of makeup using retouched photographs of herself.

In March 2024, ASA underwent a brand refresh which included a new name, visual identity and website.

== Other regulators ==
As well as the Advertising Standards Authority, advertising in specific media types or of specific product and service types are subject to regulation by other bodies or statutes; for example broadcast advertising by the Broadcasting Authority of Ireland, financial services by the Central Bank of Ireland, and solicitors by the Law Society of Ireland.
