= Anthony Cleaver =

British engineer and executive (1938–2025)

Sir Anthony Cleaver HonFREng
- Born: Anthony Brian Cleaver; 10 April 1938
- Died: 13 July 2025 (aged 87)
- Education: Trinity College, Oxford
- Engineering career
- Discipline: System engineering

Sir Anthony Brian Cleaver (10 April 1938 – 13 July 2025) was a British engineer and executive. He started his career as a systems engineer with IBM UK Ltd in 1962. He was later Chairman of the United Kingdom Atomic Energy Authority and steered AEA Technology through its privatisation. He also chaired the UK Nuclear Decommissioning Authority and the Medical Research Council.

== Life and career ==
Cleaver studied Literae humaniores at Trinity College, Oxford, graduating in 1962.

He served on the boards of Smith & Nephew, Lockheed Martin UK and IX Europe. In the field of education, Cleaver chaired the Governors of Birkbeck, University of London and the Royal College of Music. In August 2007, he was appointed Chairman of EngineeringUK (formerly the Engineering and Technology Board (ETB)). In this role, Cleaver was a driving force behind the founding of the UK's Big Bang Fair which was first run in 2008 and by 2015 had become one of Europe's largest science, engineering and technology fairs for young people. Cleaver retired from his role at EngineeringUK in 2011 and as Patron of the Big Bang Fair a few years later.

Cleaver was chairman of recruitment company SThree and financial wrap provider Novia Financial.

Cleaver died on 13 July 2025, at the age of 87.
