= Pobal =

State-sponsored social development organisation in Ireland

Agency overview
- Formed: November 1992; 33 years ago
- Preceding agency: Area Development Management Limited (ADM)
- Jurisdiction: Ireland
- Headquarters: Holles Street, Dublin, Ireland
- Agency executive: Anna Shakespeare
- Parent department: Department of Rural and Community Development and the Gaeltacht
- Website: www.pobal.ie

Pobal (English: Community) is a state-sponsored organisation in Ireland with responsibility for administering and managing government and EU funding aimed at supporting social inclusion and addressing social disadvantage in the country. While the organisation is registered with the Charities Regulator, its charitable status was queried in 2018.

== Background and strategy ==
Pobal was established in 1992 by the Irish Government, in agreement with the European Commission, to manage an EU local development grant scheme. Originally known as Area Development Management Limited (ADM), the company was incorporated in October 1992 and commenced operations in November 1992. ADM was not established under specific legislation, and is subject to Irish company law. Members later agreed to change the name to Pobal, which officially took place on 8 September 2005.

The agency's activities and priorities are shaped by the context and policies laid out by government in several documents, including the Programme for Government – Government for National Recovery 2011–2016, the Action Plan for Jobs, the Action Plan for Rural Development, Project Ireland 2040 and Pathways to Work. Examples of the groups supported by government through Pobal include those who have been long-term unemployed, young people, farmers / fishermen, families, Irish Travellers, older people and ex-prisoners. Pobal has formed alliances nationally and internationally, including with the Organisation for Economic Co-operation and Development (OECD) and the Economic and Social Research Institute (ESRI). For example, in 2022, Pobal commissioned the ESRI to undertake a survey into how poverty persists from one generation to the next.

== Activities ==
Pobal allocated circa €1.198 billion in funding in 2023, providing support for approximately 39 programmes across the country in the areas of social inclusion and equality, inclusive employment and enterprise, and early learning and care. The group administers these programmes on behalf of the Department of Rural and Community Development and the Gaeltacht, the Department of Children, Disability and Equality, the Department of Social Protection, the Department of Health/HSE, as well as the Department of Justice, Home Affairs and Migration and a number of EU bodies. Pobal's lead department, the Department of Rural and Community Development and the Gaeltacht conducts a Periodic Critical Review report of the organisation, the most recent of which was approved by Minister Heather Humphreys on 29 September 2021.

=== Pobal Maps ===
Pobal holds a volume of data about the programmes they manage. To support governmental bodies as well as individuals in making use of this data, Pobal developed an interactive graphical information system called 'Pobal Maps'. Pobal Maps is a free geographic information system (GIS) which provides a range of functions, allowing users to see where Pobal delivers funding to, as well as providing a way of accessing and using the Pobal HP Deprivation Index, details on childcare services, and a range of other funded services throughout the Republic of Ireland.

==== Pobal HP Deprivation Index ====
The Pobal HP Deprivation Index, developed every 5 years with new data after each successive census of the country, is (according to the organisation) "Ireland’s most widely used social gradient metric". The index uses information such as employment, age profile and educational attainment, to calculate this score. Pobal has been the principal sponsor of successive deprivation indices created about Ireland and maintains a dedicated section of its website to publishing reports, data files and online mapping tools for the Pobal HP Deprivation Index. From 2006 to 2016, creation of these indices has been funded by Pobal in partnership with the independent social and economic consultants team of Trutz Haase and Dr. Jonathan Pratschke. From the 2011 census onwards, information became available at the newly created "Small Area" level. Small Areas are the most granular census tract level measured in Ireland which relate to parcels of land containing between 80 and 100 households on average, allowing the user to see the extent to which every neighbourhood, suburb and village in the state is either affluent or deprived.

The index is also used by the Department of Education and Youth for the designation of schools under DEIS (Delivering Equality of Opportunity in Schools), the HSE for the creation of their Health Atlas Ireland, the Central Statistics Office for optimising sampling methodologies, the Department of Culture, Communications and Sport for sports capital application appraisals, as well as Tusla and various Drug and Alcohol Task Forces for the carrying out of resource allocation modelling. Pobal's own Resource Allocation Model (Pobal-RAM) is also based on their own HP Deprivation Index. As of September 2022, a Deprivation Index had yet to be released using information gathered from the 2022 census of Ireland.

== Management ==
The board of directors, which is appointed by the Irish government, is responsible for the governance and strategic direction of Pobal. The board consists of a chairperson and fifteen other directors, all of whom work in a voluntary capacity receiving no fees or remuneration for the time spent in carrying out their duties. Since September 2021, Rosarii Mannion has served as chairperson of the board.

The day-to-day management of the organisation is overseen by a Strategic Leadership Team (SLT), including a chief executive officer (CEO), deputy CEO, Chief Finance Officer (CFO) and Chief Operations Officer (COO). In 2018, the independent TD Mick Wallace questioned the salary of the chief executive of the organisation.

The organisation had 270 employees in 2009, growing to 731 employees according to its 2023 annual report. Pobal has offices in Dublin, Monaghan, Sligo, Clifden, Letterkenny, Cork, Galway city, Limerick, Mullingar and Kilkenny. Its head office is on Holles Street in Dublin city centre.

== See also ==
- State agencies of the Republic of Ireland
