= Science.ie =

Irish STEM-related website

The Science.ie portal provides all sorts of information about careers in science, technology, engineering and mathematics (STEM).

== Overview ==
Science.ie is an initiative of the Irish Government’s Discover Science & Engineering (DSE) awareness programme in Ireland. DSE is managed by Forfás on behalf of the Office of Science and Technology at the Department of Enterprise, Tourism and Employment.

The careers-related information on Science.ie has been moved to a new DSE website, which was launched in early October 2009. On MyScienceCareer.ie is:

- Profiles of people currently working in STEM in Ireland
- Information on famous Irish scientists
- Links to many other career resources

A redeveloped Science.ie was also launched in October 2009. The site has been redesigned and includes social media bookmarking and RSS feeds.

Science.ie provides more general information on science in Ireland. This includes listings of science links, news and events. Its "Resources" section gives information on activities and visitor centres where you can learn about science.

The site also provides a free newsletter relating to Irish science, technology and innovation news, events, research and facts which is issued monthly by email.

DSE runs numerous other initiatives, including My Science Career, Project Blogger, Science Week Ireland and Discover Primary Science.
