= Greenwave =

Mass science experiment

- Industry: Science education
- Area served: Ireland
- Parent: Discover Science & Engineering awareness programme

Greenwave is a mass science experiment involving primary schools across Ireland. It examines and records how spring arrives in Ireland. This is an educational and science initiative of the Irish Government’s Discover Science & Engineering (DSE) awareness programme.

Irish students observe and record when certain plants and animals react to the longer days and warmer temperatures, in order to find out whether the "green wave" of spring moves from south to north across Ireland or inland from the coast to the centre of the country.

== Skill development ==
Taking part in Greenwave is a practical way to support the teaching of Social Environmental and Scientific Education (SESE) part of the Irish Primary School Curriculum. The students develop their skills in:

- Observing
- Classifying
- Recognising patterns
- Estimating and measuring
- Recording and communicating

== Other programs ==
Schools registered in the Discover Primary Science programme, another initiative of DSE, can also earn credit towards their Award of Science Excellence by taking part in Greenwave.

DSE runs numerous other initiatives, including Science Week Ireland, Discover Primary Science and Science.ie.
