= My Science Career =

Irish online resources website for STEM

The My Science Career website is an Irish online resource for career information in science, technology, engineering and mathematics (STEM).

The website has a famous Irish scientists section, science related articles, a science career glossary and a video interviews section with scientists about their work. “A day in the life” section looks at the everyday working loves of Irish scientists and science broadcasters, ranging from a professor of biochemistry to a marine photographer.

A “Science Ambassadors” section profiles Irish scientists on what it’s like working in various fields and the qualifications they have. The Science Ambassadors range from newly qualified graduates to well established researchers.

MyScienceCareer.ie is an initiative of Ireland’s national integrated awareness programme Discover Science & Engineering (DSE), a government initiative. DSE runs numerous other initiatives, including Science.ie, Science Week Ireland and Discover Primary Science.
