= PB =

Pb is the chemical symbol for the chemical element lead. PB, P.B., or Pb may also refer to:

== Arts and entertainment ==
=== Music ===
- Paul's Boutique, a 1989 album by American hip-hop group the Beastie Boys
- Prussian Blue (duo), an American white nationalist pop pre-teen duo
- PB, an album by Norwegian musician Per Bergersen

=== Periodicals ===
- Performance Bikes (magazine), a monthly British motorcycling magazine
- Playboy, an American men's magazine
- Post-Bulletin, an American daily newspaper based in Rochester, Minnesota

=== Television ===
- Princess Bubblegum, a character from the 2010 animated TV series Adventure Time
- Prison Break, an American drama television series which originally ran from 2005 to 2009
- Puppy Bowl, an American special based on the Super Bowl airing each year on Animal Planet since 2005

=== Other media ===
- Paperback, a type of book
- Phantom Blood, the first story arc of shōnen manga series Jojo's Bizarre Adventure

== Companies and organizations ==
=== Manufacturers ===
- Packard Bell Corporation, an American radio manufacturer formed in 1933 that later became a defense contractor and manufacturer of other consumer electronics
- Packard Bell, a Dutch computer manufacturer which took its name from the earlier American company
- Pitney Bowes, an American manufacturer of software and hardware and a provider of services related to documents, packaging, mailing, and shipping
- PocketBook International, a producer of e-book readers under the PocketBook brand
- Beretta (Pietro Beretta Arms Factory), an Italian firearms manufacturer

=== Other businesses ===
- Palladium Books, a publisher of role-playing games
- Panera Bread, a chain of bakery–café quick casual restaurants in the US and Canada
- Parsons Brinckerhoff, an American professional services firm, now a part of WSP
- PBair, a now-defunct Thai airline
- Photobucket, an image hosting, video hosting, slideshow creation and photo sharing website
- Piranha Bytes, a German video game developer
- Pitney Bowes, an American manufacturer of software and hardware and a provider of services related to documents, packaging, mailing, and shipping
- Pottery Barn, an American-based home furnishing retail store chain
- ProBoards, an online message board service

=== Other organizations ===
- Pirate Bay, a file-sharing organization
- Progressive Bulgaria (Прогресивна България), a political party in Bulgaria
- Prosperity Party (Paartii Badhaadhiinaa), a political party in Ethiopia
- Brunei Polytechnic, a post-secondary institution in Brunei

== Economics and finance ==
- Payback period, in capital budgeting refers to the period of time required for the return on an investment to "repay" the sum of the original investment
- Performance bond, a surety bond issued by an insurance company or a bank to guarantee satisfactory completion of a project by a contractor
- Premium Bond, a lottery bond issued by the UK government's National Savings and Investments scheme
- Price-to-book ratio, a financial ratio used to compare a company's book value to its current market price
- Participatory budgeting, a process of democratic deliberation to allocate parts of a public budget

== Education ==
- Brunei Polytechnic, a post-secondary institution in Brunei
- Project Blogger, an Irish educational initiative
- Library of Congress Classification:Class P, subclass PB -- Modern languages and Celtic languages

== People ==
- Panda Bear (musician) (born 1978), an experimental American musician and founding member of Animal Collective
- Chris Pontius (born 1974), an American entertainer and daredevil nicknamed "Party Boy"

== Places ==
=== United States ===
- Pacific Beach, San Diego, California, a neighborhood in San Diego, California
- Palm Bay, Florida
- Palm Beach, Florida
- Pine Bluff, Arkansas
- Pismo Beach, California

=== Other countries ===
- Paraíba, a state of Brazil
- Port Blair, a town in the Andaman Islands
- Punjab (disambiguation), the name of several locations in South Asia
- Paderborn, town and eponymous district in Germany, known by their vehicle registration code PB
- Považská Bystrica, town in Slovakia, known by its vehicle registration code PB
- Guatemala (CIA cryptonym)
- West Papua (province) (vehicle registration prefix PB)

== Science and technology ==
=== Chemistry ===
- Lead, symbol Pb, a chemical element
- Polybutylene, a polymer of the substance butylene

=== Computing and software ===
- Petabit (Pb), a unit of information equivalent to 1000 terabits used, for example, to quantify computer memory or storage capacity
- Petabyte (PB), a unit of information equivalent to 1000 terabytes, used, for example, to quantify computer memory or storage capacity
- PowerBook, a line of laptop computers produced by Apple
- PowerBuilder, an integrated software development environment
- PunkBuster, a computer program designed to detect software used for cheating in online games

=== Medicine ===
- Peripheral blood, deoxygenated blood in the circulatory system
- Phenobarbital, a barbiturate

=== Other uses in science and technology ===
- PB (pistol), a Soviet silenced pistol intended for army reconnaissance groups and the KGB
- Picobarn, one trillionth of a barn, a unit of area used in physics
- Pipe bomb, an improvised explosive device consisting of a tightly sealed section of pipe filled with an explosive material
- Push button, a momentary button activated only while pressed by user

== Sports ==
- Personal Best, the best time or score ever achieved by an athlete in a particular event
- Paintball, a sport in which players tag opponents by firing dye capsules from a paintball gun
- Passed ball, in baseball

== Transportation ==
- Patrol boat, a relatively small naval vessel generally designed for coastal defense duties
- Pilatus Railway or Pilatusbahn, a mountain railway in Switzerland
- Irizar PB, a bus coach body
- West Papua (vehicle registration prefix PB)

== Other uses ==
- Paperback, a type of book
- Peanut butter, a food paste made primarily from ground dry roasted peanuts
- Personal best, an individual's best performance in a given sporting discipline
- Plant based, a diet consisting mostly or entirely of plant-based foods
- Post box, a physical box into which members of the public can deposit outgoing mail
- Powerball, an American lottery game
- Presiding Bishop, an ecclesiastical position in some denominations of Christianity
- Pro bono, professional work undertaken voluntarily for little or no payment as a public service

== See also ==
- BP (disambiguation)
