= Bord Bia =

Irish food promotion board

State Agency of the Department of Agriculture, Food and the Marine overview
- Formed: 1 December 1994
- Preceding agencies: Córas Beostoic agus Feola - Irish Meat and Livestock Board; An Bord Tráchtála
- Jurisdiction: Ireland
- Headquarters: 140 Pembroke Road; Ballsbridge; Dublin 4
- State Agency of the Department of Agriculture, Food and the Marine executive: Larry Murrin, Chairman
- Key document: An Bord Bia Act, 1994
- Website: Official website

Bord Bia (English: Food Board) is an Irish semi state agency for the promotion of Irish food, drink, and horticulture in Ireland and abroad.

The agency works for small producers by promoting and certifying farmers' markets and for bigger producers by offering international marketing services.

== History ==
Bord Bia was founded in 1994 as an amalgamation of the Coras Beostoic agus Feola (Meat and Livestock Board) and the food promotion activities of the Irish Trade Board. In 2004, it amalgamated with Bord Glas, which used to be responsible for the development of the horticulture industry. In 2009, Bord Bia took over the promotion of seafood from Bord Iascaigh Mhara.

Part of the organisation's work is "promoting better ways of producing, by innovation and setting 'best practice' standards". According to the 2010 report Pathways for Growth, published by Bord Bia, Ireland should:

"adopt a strategy of developing a world-class agricultural industry by 2016 and set itself the goal of becoming the most efficient, most highly innovative food and drink country in the world."

== Organisation ==
Bord Bia acts as a link between Irish producers and their customers worldwide. For that purpose, it has several overseas offices in, amongst other cities, Amsterdam, Shanghai and New York City.

In 2008, Bord Bia received 30 million euros for an advertising campaign in the period 2008–2013. In 2009, the "Oireachtas Grant-in-Aid" was 28 million a year. With other incomes (earmarked grants, levies and so on) the organisation had a budget in 2009 of about 43.5 million euros.

== Developments ==
Bord Bia is mostly known for its certification of Irish food products under the label Origin Green, through which it launched the world's first national sustainability food program. The logo connected to this scheme is used at home and abroad.

In May 2011, Bord Bia published their goal of increasing food exports by 40% in 2020 compared with the 2010 level.
