= Competition Authority (Ireland) =

Competition Authority of Ireland

Former State agency of the Department of Enterprise, Tourism and Employment overview
- Formed: 2002
- Dissolved: 31 October 2014
- Superseding Former State agency of the Department of Enterprise, Tourism and Employment: Competition and Consumer Protection Commission
- Jurisdiction: Ireland
- Headquarters: 14 Parnell Square, Dublin 1
- Former State agency of the Department of Enterprise, Tourism and Employment executive: Isolde Goggin, Chairman
- Key document: Competition Act, 2002
- Website: Competition Authority website

The Competition Authority (TCA) was responsible for enforcing Irish and European competition law in the Republic of Ireland and promoting competition in the economy. In 2014 it was amalgamated with the National Consumer Agency to form the Competition and Consumer Protection Commission.

== Purpose and powers ==
Consumers were at the core of the Competition Authority's work. Its aim was to make sure that competition worked for the benefit of all consumers who bought products and services in Ireland. This included businesses, the State and its agents, as well as individuals.

It had the power to investigate if there was evidence that businesses were involved in anti-competitive practices, such as price-fixing, or that businesses were abusing a dominant position. It could also block mergers between businesses that would substantially reduce competition and harm consumers.

The Authority also had a very broad role to promote competition in the economy. They did this by calling for reform when Irish laws, regulations or actions by State bodies restrict competition. They advised the Government and its agents on how proposed legislation or regulations could affect competition. This prevented future problems for consumers. This helped to give a voice to consumers when it came to public policy-making. They also promoted competition by telling public authorities and the public about the benefits of competition.

== Operations ==
The Authority operated under the Competition Act 2002 and was funded via a grant from the Department of Jobs, Enterprise and Innovation.

The authority was divided into six divisions: Cartels, Monopolies, Advocacy, Mergers, Strategy and Corporate Services. The Authority was a collegiate body, consisting of four full-time members, each headed one or more divisions, appointed following an open competition by the Public Appointments Service.

The former Members of the Authority were Chairperson Isolde Goggin and Members Stephen Calkins, Gerald FitzGerald and Patrick Kenny.

== Amalgamation ==
In November 2008, the Government announced the amalgamation of the Competition Authority and the National Consumer Agency as part of a rationalisation of State agencies. On 31 March 2014 the Competition and Consumer Protection Bill was published. On 31 July Richard Bruton, TD, Minister for Jobs, Enterprise and Innovation announced that the legislation would commence and the new Competition and Consumer Protection Commission would be established on 31 October 2014.

The Competition and Consumer Protection Commission has a dual mandate to enforce competition and consumer law. Both organisations continued to perform their statutory functions until the merger was given effect on 31 October 2014.

The Competition and Consumer Protection Commission is currently governed by an executive chair and a Membership structure. The Competition and Consumer Protection Act, 2014 allows for a chair and between two and six Members.

The former Chair of the Competition Authority, Isolde Goggin, was appointed Chairperson of the Competition and Consumer Protection Commission on taking up her former role in 2011. Ms Goggin is supported in her role by the Members of the new Commission which include the two former Members of the Competition Authority, Fergal O'Leary and Patrick Kenny, and the former Chief Executive of the National Consumer Agency, Karen O'Leary, all of whom were appointed Members-designate of the Competition and Consumer Protection Commission by the Minister for Jobs, Enterprise and Innovation upon taking up their current positions.
