= Healthcare in the Republic of Ireland =

Health care in Ireland is delivered through public and private healthcare. The public health care system is governed by the Health Act 2004, which established a new body to be responsible for providing health and personal social services to everyone living in Ireland – the Health Service Executive. The HSE national health service officially began on 1 January 2005. A large scale reform program called Sláintecare has been in progress since 2020 aiming to transition to a universal single-tier health and social care system. Alongside the publicly funded HSE there is a large private healthcare system funded through optional health insurance and direct payment models.

In 2019 Ireland spent €3,513 per capita on health, close to the European Union average, of this spending approximately 79% was government expenditure. In 2017 spending was the seventh highest in the OECD at $5,500 per head.

Overcrowding has been an issue at hospitals in Ireland, with over 118,000 patients having to wait for a bed in 2019.

== History ==
In his Confessio Authoris, published posthumously by Jan Baptist van Helmont (a chemist from Brussels) in 1648, he noted that "The Irish nobility had in every family a domestic physician whose recommendation was not that he came from the College loaded with learning but that he was able to cure disorders; which knowledge they have from their ancestors by means of a book belonging to particular families that contains the marks of the several diseases, with the remedies attached; which remedies where vernacula the production of their own country - for this reason the Irish are better managed than the Italians who have a physician in every village". According to John F. Fleetwood, there was little organisation of the medical practice in Ireland until at least the mid-19th century, and quackery was widespread in the 1700s.

== Healthcare system ==
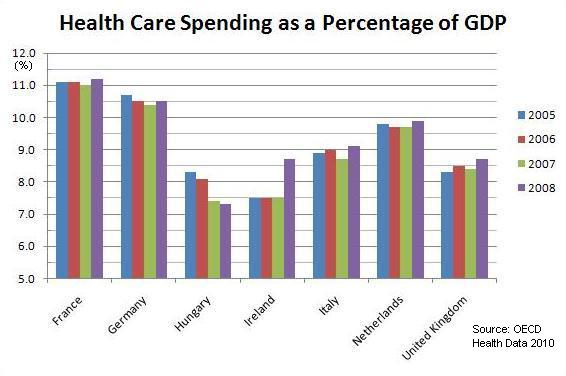
Total health spending as a percentage of GDP for Ireland compared amongst various other first world nations from 2005 to 2008

All persons resident in Ireland are entitled to receive health care through the public health care system, which is managed by the Health Service Executive and funded by general taxation and subsidised fees for service. All maternity services and child care up to the age of six years are provided free of charge. Emergency care is provided at a cost of €100 for a visit to an Emergency Department (ED), though there is no fee if referred by a GP.

The Medical Card – which entitles holders to free hospital care, GP visits, dental services, optical services, aural services, and medical appliances – is available to those receiving welfare payments, low earners, many retirees, and in certain other cases. It also provides exemption from standard prescription charges, replacing them with a flat government levy. The only medical conditions carrying automatic entitlement to a card are having thalidomide syndrome, having a surgical symphysiotomy, and children with cancer. Many political parties support extending the availability of the Medical Card to eventually cover every resident in Ireland. It currently covers 31.9% of the population. Those who do not qualify may be eligible for a GP Visit Card, which entitles the holder to free general practitioner visits. Persons over 70 years who are not entitled to a medical GP visit card can instead receive an annual cash grant of €400 up to a certain income.

People who are not entitled to a Medical Card (68.1% of the population) must pay fees for certain health care services. There is a €100 charge for those who attend an emergency department without a referral letter from a family doctor (a visit to which usually costs €45–75, though some practices offer rates as low as €25-35 for over-65s and students). Hospital charges (for inpatients) are now €0 per day. A flat fee of €80 per day up to a maximum of €800 in any twelve-month period, irrespective of the actual care received used to apply but has been abolished since 18th April 2023. Specialist assessments and diagnostic assessments (such as X-rays, laboratory tests, physiotherapy, etc.) are provided free of charge. If a person cannot afford to pay hospital charges, the HSE will provide the services free of charge. Under the Drugs Payment Scheme, prescription drugs, individuals and families are eligible for subsidies for approved prescription drugs, medicines, and certain appliances, and pay only a maximum of €80 per month per household. To qualify a patient must hold a Drugs Payment Scheme Card, for which everyone who does not hold a Medical Card is eligible.

Everyone living in the country, and visitors to Ireland who hold a European Health Insurance Card, are entitled to use the public healthcare system. Under Common Travel Area (CTA) arrangements, British citizens do not require an EHIC card and can instead present their NHS number, NHS card, driving licence or other proof of residence within the CTA. Outpatient services are also provided without charge. The majority of patients on median incomes or above are required to pay subsidised hospital charges.

=== Hospitals ===
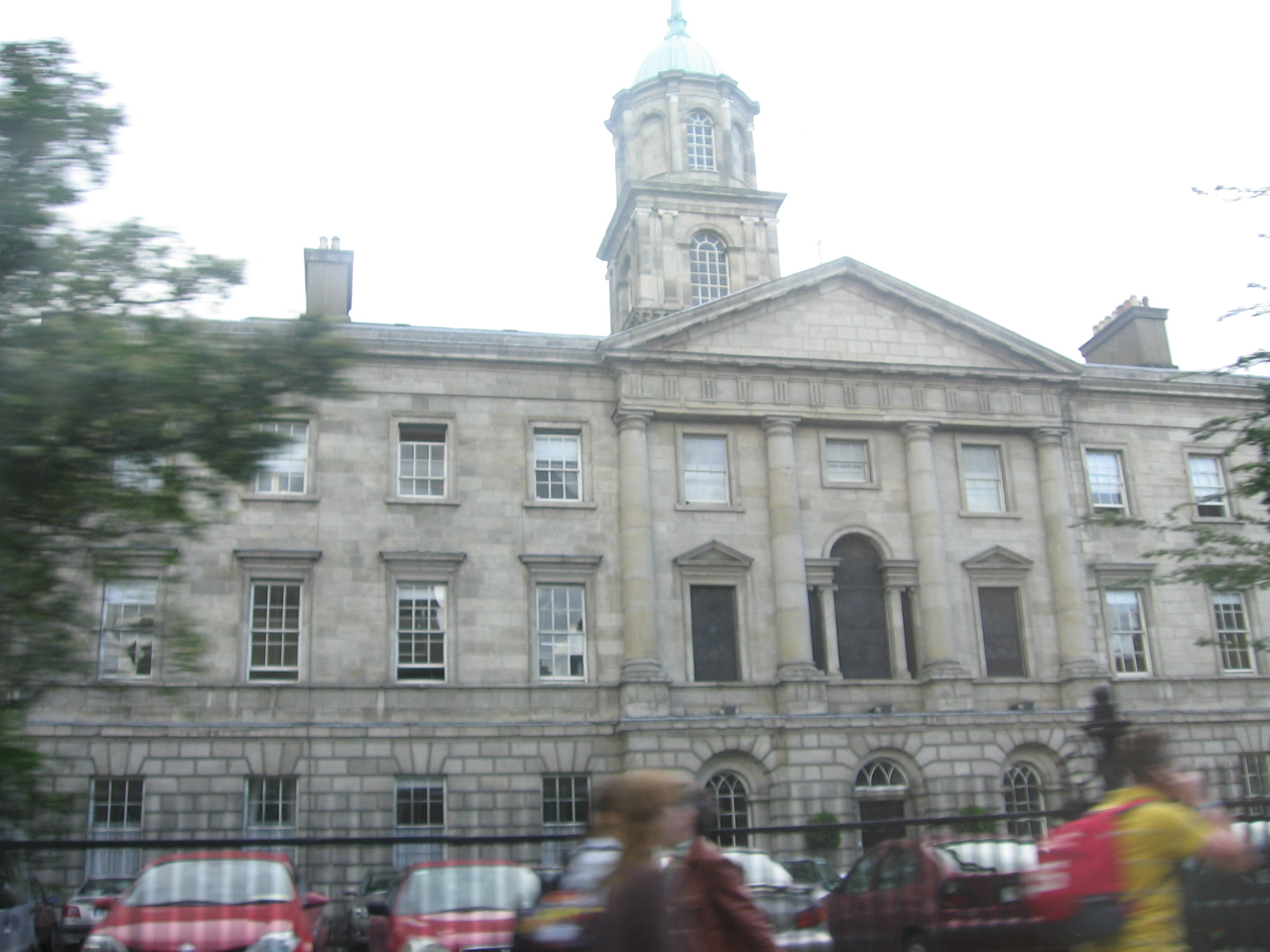
The Rotunda Hospital in Dublin is the world's oldest maternity hospital, founded in 1745. It is also one of its largest, dealing with over eight thousand births in 2007.

Hospitals in Ireland generally offer a full range of healthcare including accident and emergency services. Many hospitals in Ireland, such as Connolly Hospital at Blanchardstown, are operated directly by the Health Service Executive. There are also hospitals run on a voluntary basis by organisations who receive public funding but operate with some degree of autonomy. Included in this latter group are teaching hospitals (such as University Hospital Galway) operated in conjunction with a university and hospitals with a long-standing religious ethos e.g. Tallaght University Hospital in Dublin. There are also many private hospitals. Ireland has a lower than OECD-average number of hospital beds according to the 2013 OECD Health at a Glance Report The same report also noted that Ireland has fewer doctors (2.7 doctors per 1,000 population) and more nurses (12.2 nurses per 1,000 population) than average in other OECD countries. Consultants in the publicly funded hospitals are allowed to spend some of their time (typically 20%, though there is little supervision) on private practice.

==== Waiting lists ====
As of 2013, Ireland reduced its spending on health care by 6.6% since the onset of the 2008 financial crisis according to the OECD's 2013 Health Report. As a consequence, waiting times for treatment have increased.

According to the Euro health consumer index waiting times for emergency treatment, minor operations, and CT scans, in Irish hospitals in 2015 were the worst in Europe, though the Irish health system was ranked 21st out of 35 European countries. The Health Service Executive accepted that it lacked the capacity to provide sufficiently accessible health services. It was working to ensure that no one had to wait more than 18 months for an outpatient appointment, or inpatient treatment. According to the index, reports by patients on waiting times were considerably more pessimistic than official Irish waiting-time statistics. The Euro health consumer index 2018 report continues to rank the accessibility of Ireland's Health system as the worst in Europe, with the overall ranking as 22nd of 35.

In 2007, 76% of inpatients were admitted to hospital for operations immediately, 11% had to wait up to one month, 4% had to wait up to three months, 1% had to wait up to six months and 4% had to wait for over six months for operations. Waiting times at the National Rehabilitation Hospital, the only such facility in the country, can be one year. For outpatients, 23% were seen on time, 44% were seen within 30 minutes, 18% waited more than an hour and 7% waited two hours.

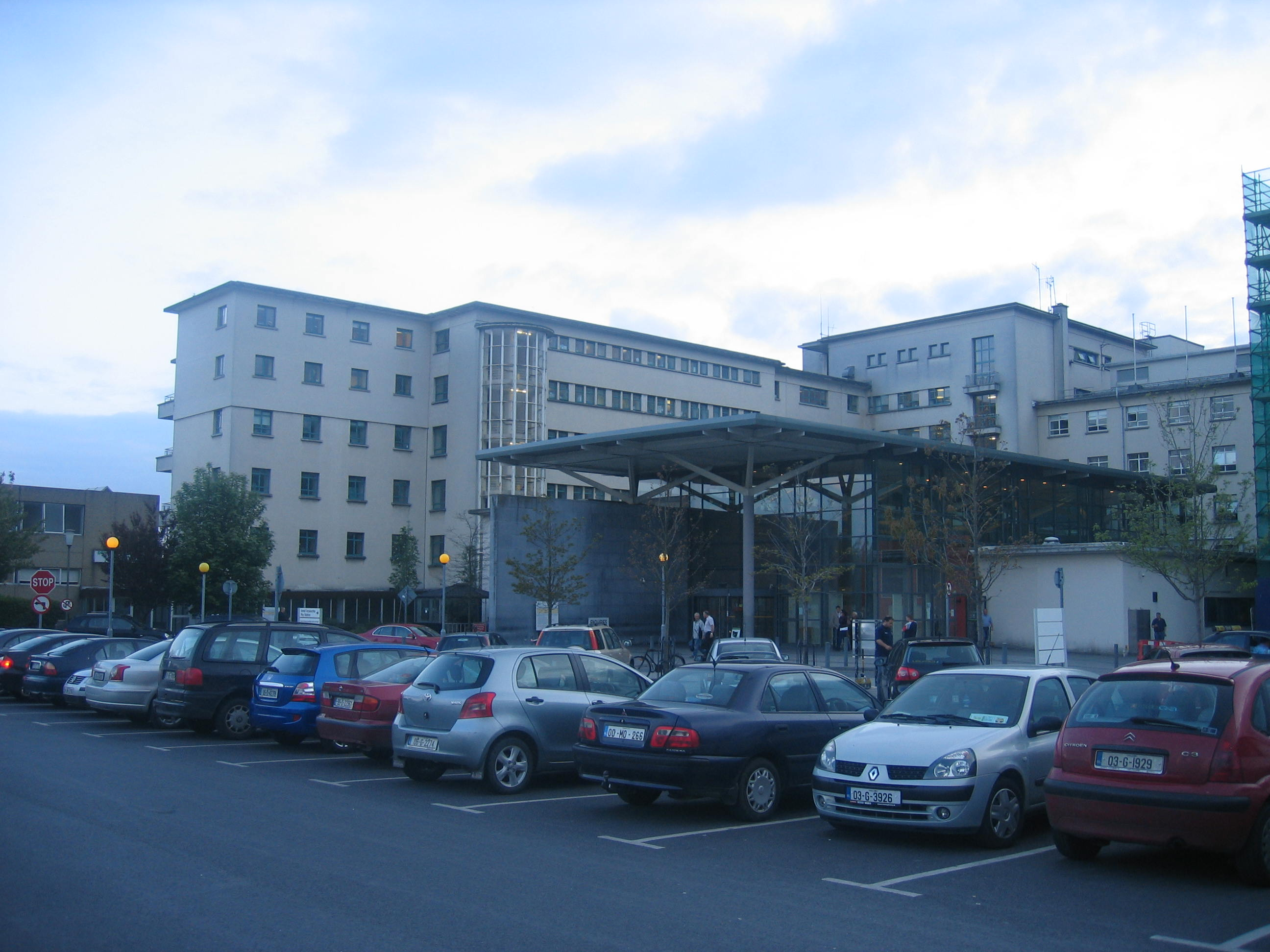
University Hospital Galway is one of Ireland's largest hospitals, dealing with over two hundred thousand patients in 2007.

In 2007, for GP services, 31% were seen without an appointment, 38% received an appointment the same day, 28% received a next day appointment and 3% had to wait over two days to be seen.

The National Treatment Purchase Fund (NTPF) was set up in 2002 for those waiting over three months for an operation or procedure, and as a result over 135,000 patients on waiting lists have been treated so far. The NTPF involves the government paying for public patients to be treated for free in a private hospital in Ireland, or sometimes abroad if necessary. The NTPF has reduced waiting times for procedures to an average of between two and five months (the average in 2009 is 2.4 months), compared to between two and five years in 2002. There are cases where essential care is needed urgently but not made available by the HSE under their NTPF, and contrary to relevant judgements by the European Court of Justice.

HSE figures quoted in April 2012 show that at least 178,000 people in Ireland were on waiting lists to see specialists at an outpatient clinic, and that more than 300 patients had been waiting for over four years to be seen by a consultant after being referred by their GP.

=== Health centres ===
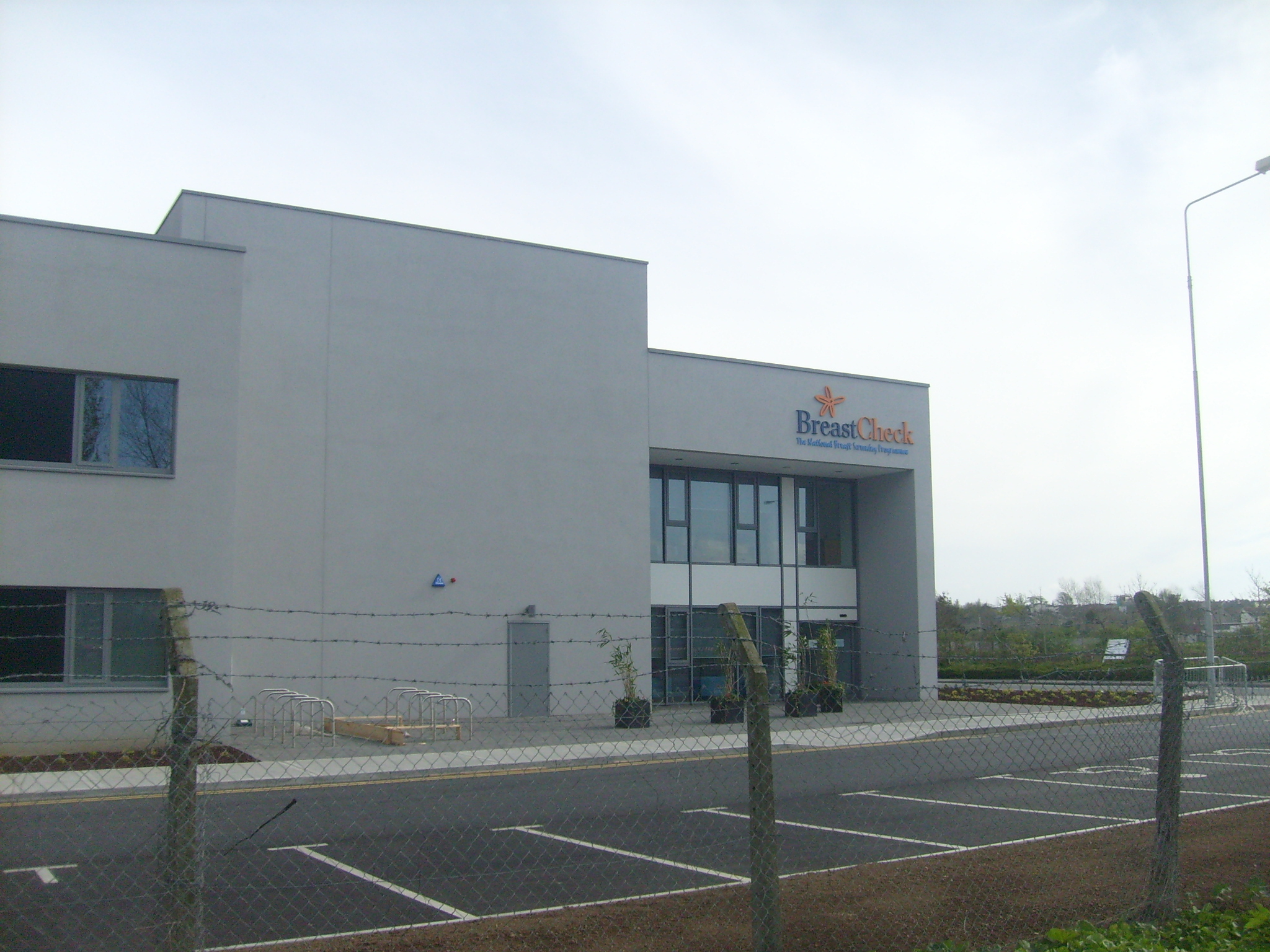
A BreastCheck centre in Galway.

Health centres provide a wide range of primary care and community services in towns and villages throughout Ireland, and are run by the HSE. Services available at these clinics include GP services, public health nurses, social work and child protection services, child health services, community welfare, disability services, older people services, chiropody, ophthalmic, speech therapy, addiction counselling and treatment, physiotherapy, occupational therapy, psychiatric services, and Home Help. These services are available for free, or at a subsidised rate.

In 2012 a programme of developing 35 primary care centres was announced. By July 2017 only one was operational. 14 are to be constructed by public-private partnerships.

==== General practitioners ====
Primary health care in Ireland is mostly provided by general practitioners (GPs), who generally operate as sole traders or in health centres with other GPs and sometimes nurses. Most GPs also offer house visits to their patients, with emergency "out-of-hours" GP services available in all parts of the country. GPs generally charge on a per-consultation fee basis, usually charging anything up to €65, depending on the region. People with Medical Cards or GP Visit Cards are exempt from charges. About 60% of the population have to pay up-front in cash. Many GPs provide free services to those with hepatitis C and maternity and infant services. Those with private health insurance can, depending on their plan, have their GP costs paid or refunded, either fully or partially, by the insurance company. People can also claim tax relief for GP visit costs.

=== Drugs ===
Prescription drugs and medical appliances are available to all for a small fee (medical card holders), reduced cost (Drugs Payment Scheme) or in certain circumstances free (under the Long Term Illness Scheme) to residents of Ireland. The Drugs Payment Scheme ensures that every household has to pay no more than €124 per calendar month for a month's supply of prescribed medicines and medical appliances, to be cut to €114 from April 2020. Some private health insurance plans provide partial reimbursement up to the Drugs Payment Scheme threshold. Those who are entitled to a medical card pay a government levy for each item dispensed. The levy is €2.00 up to a maximum of €20 per family per calendar month. Those who are suffering from one of a list of 16 long-term illnesses do not have to pay for medicines or medical appliances related to their conditions. Ireland has below-average use of generic medication according to the OECD, despite being a major exporter. The levy was reduced to €1.50 from April 2019 for medical card holders over the age of 70, and will be further cut to €1 from April 2020.

All immunisation vaccines for children are provided free of charge, in schools, health clinics and hospitals. Childhood vaccinations (up to age 16) require the consent of the parents. Vaccinations, for all high-risk childhood diseases including whooping cough (pertussis), polio, MMR (measles, mumps and rubella) and tuberculosis, are "strongly advised by the Department of Health".

Recovering heroin addicts can receive methadone treatment free of charge under the Methadone Treatment Scheme.

=== Information technology ===
The health service was said to have a ‘frail IT system’ and a ‘very-low level of cyber security maturity’ in a report by PricewaterhouseCoopers on ransomware attacks in 2021. Coombe Women & Infants University Hospital was targeted on 15 December 2021 forcing its IT services to be shut down.

=== Other services ===
The HSE provide dental, optical (vision) and aural (hearing) health care. Medical Card holders and their dependents, Health Amendment Act Card holders and children get these services free. Other people can get these services free or at a reduced cost from the Treatment Benefit Scheme or private insurance. People who pay the full price to private practitioners can claim tax relief.

The HSE also provide mental health services, and treatment and rehabilitation services for alcohol and drug addicts. The Irish healthcare system is often criticized for not providing sufficient services for those with mental health issues, leading to a rapidly growing suicide rate, and ineffective services delivered to young people.

=== Payment schemes ===
Those and their dependants without a Medical Card or private health insurance can receive medical services free or at a subsidised rate from the Treatment Benefit Scheme, which takes into account the compulsory Social Insurance Fund (PRSI) contributions they have made. People can also claim tax relief on medical expenses not covered by the State or by private health insurance. Those with private health insurance are provided with tax credits, which are passed directly to the insurance company and lower the customer's premium.

Visitors to Ireland who hold a European Health Insurance Card do not have to pay for emergency treatment from a general practitioner or specialist, emergency dental, oral or aural treatment, inpatient or outpatient hospital treatment or prescription medicines. Those who need dialysis, oxygen therapy or other specialised treatments can arrange for them before their visit.

=== Performance ===
Ireland was ranked 19th out of 34 European countries on the Personalised Health Index in 2021. The use of telemedicine has grown exponentially during the COVID-19 pandemic in Ireland and electronic prescriptions have been widely adopted. Ireland scores very poorly for Decision Support Systems in mHealth It was given high scores for legislation on Electronic Health Records but the use of electronic records across healthcare facilities was graded as poor. The problem was said to be lack of infrastructure and delays in implementing data-sharing policies.

=== Satisfaction with the health service ===
A survey, commissioned by the HSE in 2007, found that patient satisfaction with the health service was quite high, with 90% of inpatients and 85% of outpatients saying they were satisfied with their treatment. In addition to this, 97% said they were satisfied with the care provided by their GP.

The 2008 Health Consumer Powerhouse Euro Health Consumer Index report ranked Ireland's public healthcare system 11th out of 31 European countries. This is an improvement on the 2007 report which ranked Ireland 16th out of 29 countries, and a drastic improvement on the 2006 report, in which Ireland was ranked 26th out of 26 countries. Since then, satisfaction has dropped significantly again, with Ireland scoring joint last out of 30 OECD countries in healthcare satisfaction in 2023.

== Health Service Executive ==
The Health Service Executive (HSE) manages the delivery of the entire health service as a single national entity. There are four HSE administrative areas (HSE Dublin Mid-Leinster, HSE Dublin North-East, HSE South and HSE West), which are in turn divided into 32 Local Health Offices (LHOs). It is Ireland's largest employer with over 100,000 workers; and has an annual budget of €16 billion, more than any other public sector organisation.

== Minister for Health ==
The Minister for Health has responsibility for setting overall policy with regard to the health service.

== Private health insurance ==
Private health insurance is available to the population for those who want it. Vhi Healthcare (which is a semi-state company), Laya Healthcare, and Irish Life Health provide health insurance, among other services. On 2 July 2012, GloHealth entered the market to become Ireland's fourth private health insurer.

In 2005, 47.6% of people were covered by private health insurance. The regulatory body for private health insurance is the Health Insurance Authority. In 2015 the proportion of people buying private health insurance had fallen to 40%, but this is still the highest proportion of any European country. The average annual cost of basic health insurance was €1,850 in 2017. Only 13% of the total Irish expenditure on healthcare was attributed to private insurance.

== History and reform ==
Noël Browne attempted to introduce free state-funded healthcare for all mothers and children aged under 16 in 1948, but was defeated by Irish Medical Organisation and the Catholic Church, which objected to the expansion of "socialized medicine", so healthcare continued to be delivered by family doctors and in religious and charitable hospitals. The state concentrated on public health measures, and built hospitals which were still run by the church. Private hospitals benefit from tax reliefs and this has encouraged private for-profit operators into the system.

The Voluntary Health Insurance Board was established in 1957. It is still a state-owned corporation which undermines the idea of a universal, single-tier public health service as laid out in the Sustainable Development Goals to which the government is committed or Sláintecare as advocated by the Social Democrats.

The British NHS is said to outperform services in Ireland on key performance indicators.

== See also ==
- Health care system
- Health in Ireland
- Maev-Ann Wren, analyst and critic of Irish healthcare provision
- Mental health in Ireland

== Sources ==
- Fleetwood, Dr. John F. (1 September 1990). "Irish Quacks and Quackery". Dublin Historical Record. 43 (2). Dublin: Old Dublin Society: 70–84. JSTOR 30100953.
