= Laya Healthcare =

Irish health insurance company

- Company type: Privately owned
- Industry: Financial Services
- Founded: 1997; 29 years ago
- Headquarters: Little Island, County Cork, Ireland
- Products: Health Insurance
- Number of employees: 459 (2015)
- Parent: Bupa (1997–2011); Independent (2011–15); AIG (2015–22); Corebridge Financial (2022–23); Axa (2023–present)
- Website: www.layahealthcare.ie

Laya Healthcare is a health insurance company in Ireland. Its headquarters are in Little Island, County Cork. It is regulated by the Health Insurance Authority.

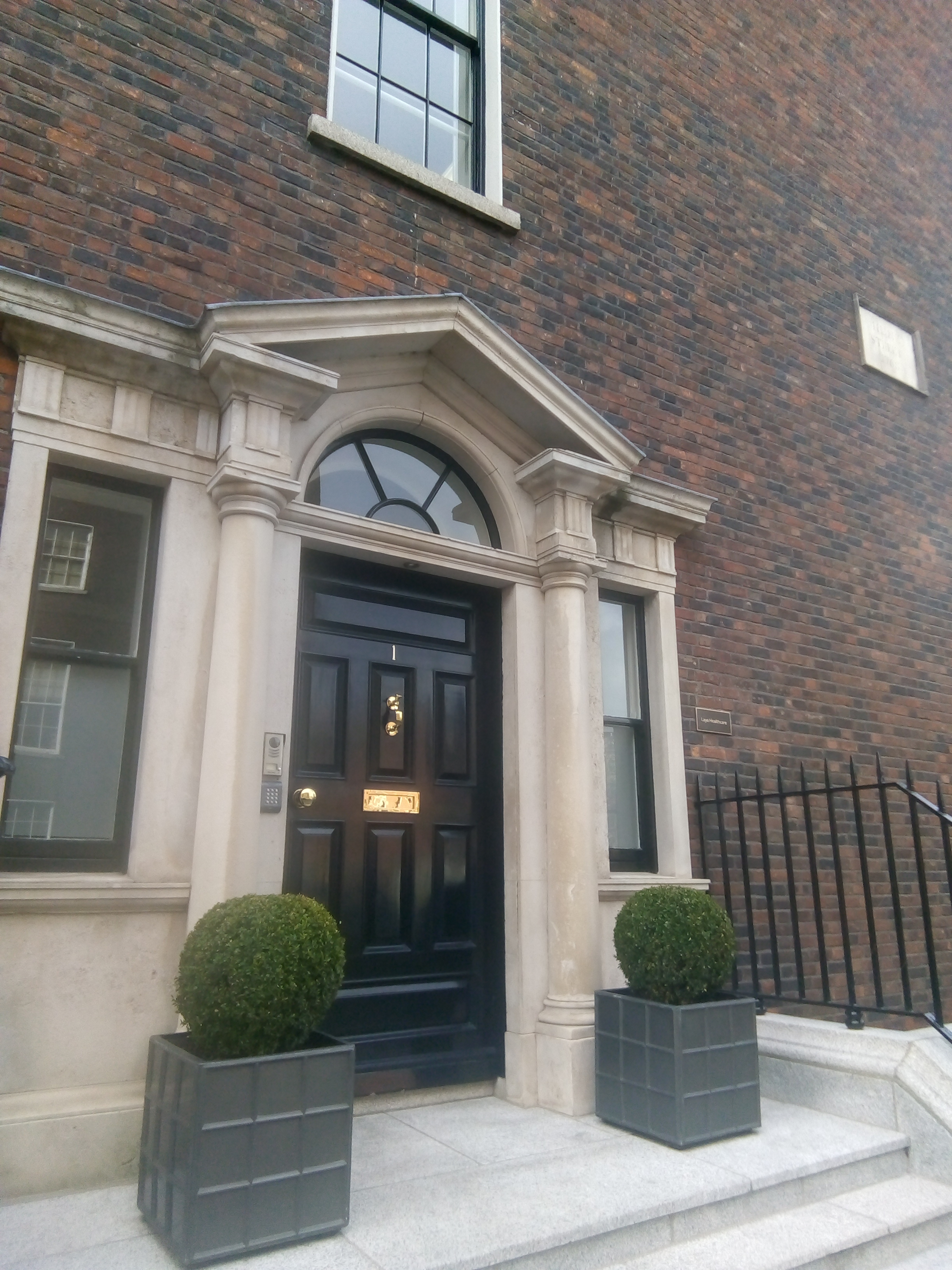
Dublin offices, at 1 Hume Street

== History ==
BUPA Ireland, then part of the wider Bupa group, entered the private medical insurance market in Ireland in 1997 ending the Vhi Healthcare monopoly which had existed for almost 4 years following the opening of the health insurance market in Ireland in 1994.

In December 2006, BUPA Ireland announced that it would be leaving the Irish market as the High Court had left the Risk Equalisation scheme unchallenged. BUPA Ireland argued it could not afford to make a cash transfer to Vhi Healthcare as required under the Risk Equalisation Scheme. In February 2007 the Quinn Group acquired BUPA Ireland and renamed it Quinn-healthcare.

As a new insurer, Quinn-healthcare was exempt from the Risk Equalisation payments for three years which was the normal concession granted to any new market entrant. In 1994 the Supreme Court ruled that the Governments Risk Equalisation specifications were incompatible with the Health Insurance Act 1994 and must be set aside. But the Health Insurance (Miscellaneous Provisions) Bill December 2008 proposed a new scheme of levies on all health insurance members to be used to fund a new system of tax credits for those over 50 who have private medical insurance.

In late 2009, the future of the entity came into question, as its holder, the Quinn Group, fell into administration, and was looking to sell off its insurance assets in the UK and Ireland. A plan was considered by the Irish Government to buy Quinn-healthcare and merge it with Vhi Healthcare, but was not acted on.

On 23 December 2011 Dónal Clancy, Managing Director of Quinn-healthcare announced that a senior management bid enabled by Swiss Re as the re-insurer was successfully concluded with the administrators. Bruce Hodkinson of Swiss Re, confirmed that Elips Life (a wholly owned subsidiary of Swiss Re) would be the underwriter.

The company was re-branded in May 2012 as Laya Healthcare. Laya means "Looking After You Always". Laya Healthcare is currently the second largest health insurer in Ireland.

On 1 April 2015, AIG acquired Laya Healthcare. That year, the company became a sponsor of Leinster Rugby.

In August 2023, it was announced Laya Healthcare had been acquired by the French multinational insurance company Axa from Corebridge Financial, (which had spun off from AIG in 2022), for €650 million. In October, the purchase was completed.

== See also ==
- Healthcare in the Republic of Ireland
