= State-sponsored bodies of the Republic of Ireland =

A State-Sponsored Body is the name given in Ireland to a state-owned enterprise (a government-owned corporation), that is to say, a commercial business which is beneficially owned, either completely or majority, by the Irish Government. Each state-sponsored body has a sponsor Minister who acts as shareholder, either independently, or in conjunction with the Minister for Finance, who may also be a shareholder. State-sponsored bodies are often popularly called semi-state companies, a misnomer, since they are all (mostly) fully owned by the state, in addition not all of them are actually companies.

== Statutory corporations ==
State-sponsored bodies may be organised as statutory corporations, meaning that they are officially non-profit and do not formally have shareholders, but have a board or other authority appointed by the sponsor Minister. Corporations of this type include:

- Córas Iompair Éireann (Irish Transport Company)
- Electricity Supply Board
- Raidió Teilifís Éireann (Radio and Television of Ireland)
- Voluntary Health Insurance Board (Vhi Healthcare)
- Horse Racing Ireland
- Teilifís na Gaeilge
- Bord Bia (Food Board)
- IDA Ireland (Industrial Development Authority)

Statutory corporations are governed under the particular statute that they are established under, and are not subject to the provisions of the Companies Acts, though similar requirements are often stated in the statute. The statutory corporation form of governance has fallen out of favour recently, with it being seen as less transparent and less commercially free than the limited company (see below). It is planned that VHI will become a limited company in the near future. On 21 January 2006 The Irish Times reported that the ESB and BGE will also move to plc status, however, both companies remained in government hands and never went to plc status. Under the draft Broadcasting Bill 2006 RTÉ and Telefís na Gaeilge would have become companies limited by guarantee, however the final Broadcasting Act 2009 retained their statutory corporation status.

== Companies with the Government as shareholder ==
Others may be organised as public limited companies or private limited companies. These are incorporated with the Companies Registration Office (Ireland) as companies, but their sole (or sometimes majority) shareholder is their sponsor minister. Some of these are exempt from the requirement to carry limited, teoranta, plc, or cpt as part of their company name. State-sponsored bodies incorporated in this fashion are, unlike their statutory corporation peers, subject to the provisions of the Companies' Acts. They have issued share capital, a board of directors, and all the other features of the type of company they are incorporated as.

In the case of bank shareholdings, these are the results of recapitalisation during the Irish banking crisis, and are all intended to be sold in time

Examples include:

Department of Agriculture, Food and the Marine

- Bord na gCon (Irish Greyhound Board)
- Coillte (Commercial Irish Forestry Business)
- Horse Racing Ireland
- Irish National Stud

Department of Communications, Energy and Natural Resources

- An Post (The Post Office)
- Ervia
- Bord na Móna plc (The Peat Board)
- EirGrid plc
- Electricity Supply Board
- Raidió Teilifís Éireann
- TG4

Department of Finance

- Permanent TSB - 75% shareholding

Department of Transport, Tourism and Sport

- Dublin Airport Authority plc
- Shannon Airport Authority
- Cork Airport Authority
- Dublin Port Company
- Port of Cork
- Drogheda Port Company
- Galway Harbour Company
- New Ross Port Company
- Shannon Foynes Port Company
- Port of Waterford Company
- Wicklow Port Company
- Córas Iompair Éireann

=== Prominent subsidiaries of state-sponsored bodies ===
Companies which are subsidiaries of state-sponsored bodies, but which enjoy a separate identity and legal existence, include:

Subsidiaries of Córas Iompair Éireann:

- Iarnród Éireann - Irish Rail
- Bus Éireann - Irish Bus
- Bus Átha Cliath - Dublin Bus

Subsidiaries of Dublin Airport Authority:

- Aer Rianta International cpt

Subsidiaries of An Post

- Prize Bond Company
- Data Ireland

Subsidiaries of Raidió Teilifís Éireann:

- 2RN
- RTÉ Commercial Enterprises

Subsidiary of Horse Racing Ireland

- Tote Ireland Limited

== Privatisations ==
Like many countries with extensive state owned sectors, the Irish Government has embarked on a programme of privatisations in recent years. Privatisations have always been controversial in Ireland. In 1991 the chief executive of Greencore was forced to resign immediately prior to the company's flotation when it was discovered he was a shareholder in a company which had been purchased by Irish Sugar prior to its flotation. However it was after the drop in the Eircom share price following the company's flotation that many became opposed to future privatisations.

=== List of privatised state-sponsored bodies ===
- Dairy Disposal Company - Dairies returned to private ownership
- Irish Sugar plc - listed on the Irish Stock Exchange as Greencore Group plc.
- Irish Life Assurance plc - listed on the ISE, later merged with Irish Permanent to form Irish Life and Permanent plc. After ILP was nationalised, Irish Life was separated by the Minister of Finance and sold to Canada Life.
- Irish Steel - sold via trade sale to Ispat International (later Mittal Steel Company). Shut down.
- British and Irish Steam Packet Company - sold via trade sale to Irish Continental Group plc.
- Nitrigin Éireann Teoranta- merged with Irish part of Imperial Chemical Industries to become Irish Fertiliser Industries Limited (closed in 2002).
- Bord Telecom Éireann plc - listed on the ISE as Eircom plc (now Eircom Group plc).
- ACCBank plc - sold via trade sale to Rabobank Ireland.
- ICC Bank plc - sold via trade sale to Bank of Scotland (Ireland).
- Cablelink - owned by Eircom and RTÉ, sold via trade sale to NTL (and later sold on to Liberty Global Europe).
- Aer Lingus Group plc. (Irish International Airlines) - listed on the ISE. A minority government shareholding was retained, but ultimately sold in July 2015.
- Great Southern Hotels - privatised via trade sale. Some hotels are now Radisson Blu, others have been rebranded or closed.
- Bord Gais Energy - customer supply division of old Bord Gáis sold in trade sale to Centrica. Infrastructure division retained as state asset.
- Permanent TSB - partially re-floated after nationalisation to prevent bank failure.
- Allied Irish Bank - partially re-floated after nationalisation to prevent bank failure.
- An Post National Lottery Company - licence sold for 20 years to a private operator, Premier Lotteries Ireland, in 2013.

== See also ==
- McCarthy Report
- Government of Ireland
- Public service bodies of the Republic of Ireland
