= The Hardiman =

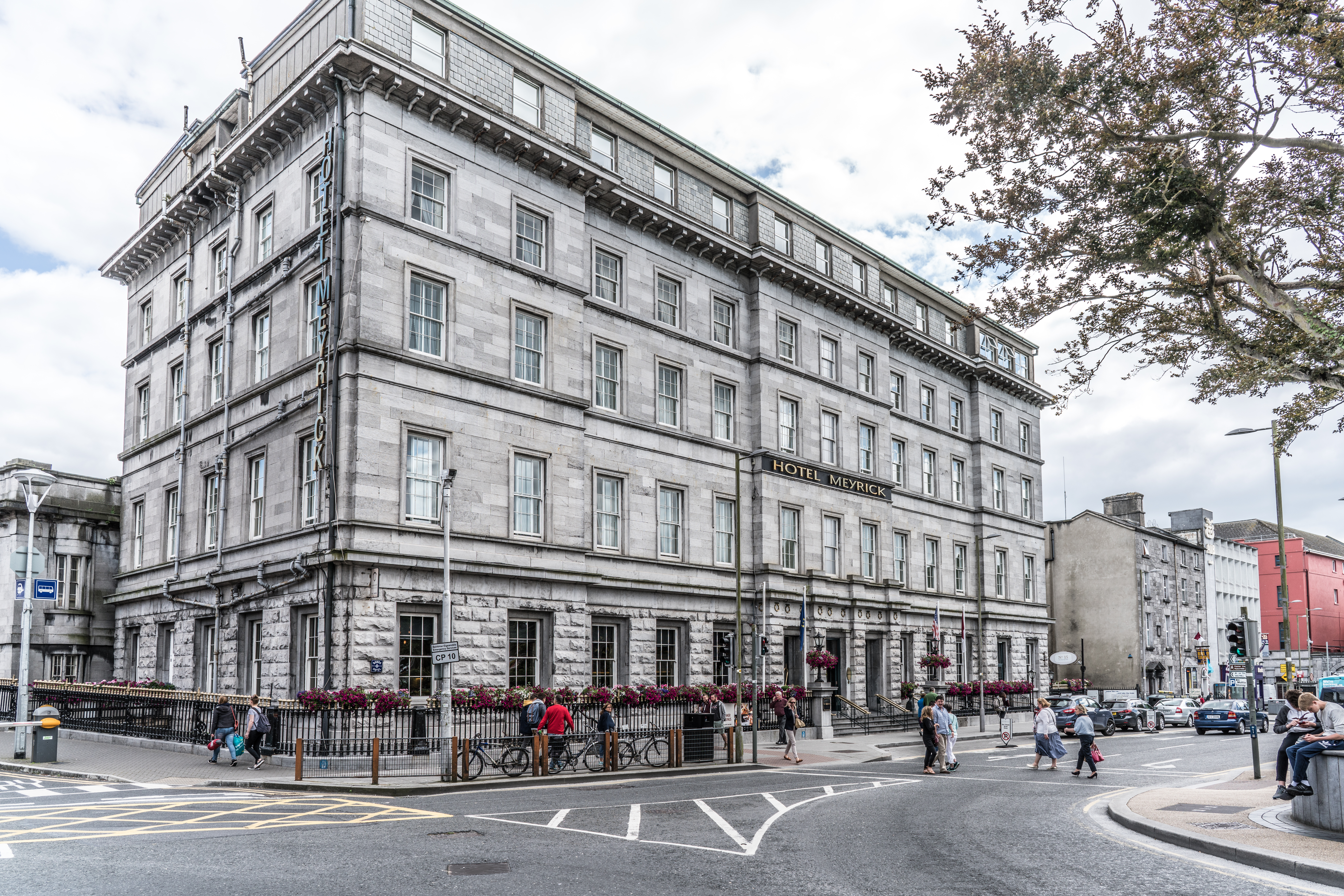
- The Hardiman Hotel

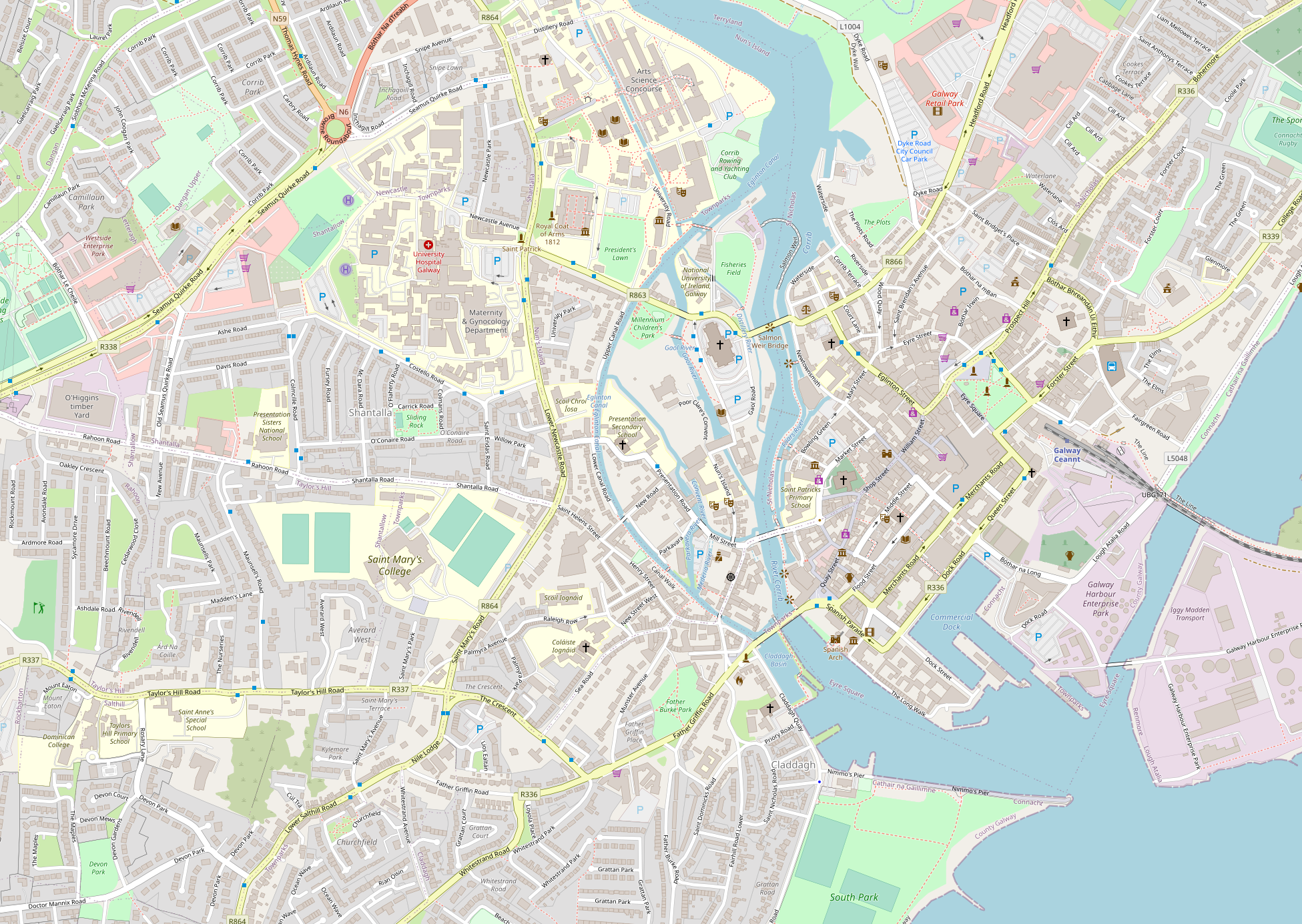
- Location within Galway
- Former names: The Railway Hotel; Great Southern Hotel; Hotel Meyrick

General information
- Type: Hotel
- Architectural style: Victorian
- Location: 14-15 Eyre Square, Galway, Ireland
- Coordinates: 53.273992°N 9.047991°W
- Opened: 16 August 1852

Design and construction
- Architect: John Skipton Mulvany
- Engineer: William Dargan

Website
- www.thehardiman.ie

The Hardiman is a hotel located in Galway City. It was designed by architect John Skipton Mulvany.

== History ==
In May 1849, the government loaned the Midland Great Western Railway £500,000 as a famine relief measure to construct a railway line between Athlone and Galway, with the requirement that the line be finished by the end of 1851.

The line was completed in August 1851, ahead of schedule and with money to spare. Following a feasibility report by MGWR engineer George Willoughby Hemans, the Midland Great Western Railway decided to divert the remaining funds of the loan to construct a railway hotel. This was the first of a number of hotels constructed by the company.

The building was designed by Irish architect John Skipton Mulvany, who was an architect for MGWR. The building contract was awarded to engineer William Dargan who used limestone to construct the facade.

The building first opened on 16 August 1852 as The Railway Hotel.

On 8 September 1924, the Dáil approved the merger of all railway companies in the Irish Free State. This saw the Great Southern and Western Railway and Midland Great Western Railway merge to form Great Southern Railways, and in 1925, the hotel was renamed the Great Southern Hotel.

On the 1 January 1945, CIÉ was established to replace Great Southern Railways. CIÉ would inherit the assets of GSR, including the Great Southern Hotel.

In 1961, the Great Southern Hotels chain was founded. ÓIE (Óstlanna Iompair Éireann), a wholly owned subsidiary of CIÉ was responsible for the operation of the Great Southern Hotels chain, however in 1990, CIÉ sold Great Southern Hotels to Aer Rianta.

In 2006, Great Southern Hotels was dissolved, and the Galway Great Southern Hotel was bought by the Monogram Hotels Group, who renamed it to Hotel Meyrick. This name came from General Meyrick, after whom Eyre Square was briefly named. However, General Meyrick was involved in suppressing the 1798 rebellion and is associated with British rule in Ireland.

In 2018, The g Hotel and Hotel Meyrick were acquired by the Irish owned Choice Hotel Group. In 2019, the hotel was renamed The Hardiman, after the Galway-based historian and scholar, James Hardiman.

== Notable guests ==
- In July 1857, Prince Louis Napoleon visited the hotel.
- In 1903, King Edward VII ate lunch at the hotel while visiting Galway.
- On 23 October 1933, Charles Lindbergh and his wife Anne Lindbergh stayed at the hotel.

== See also ==
- Galway railway station
