= Kenny Jacobs =

Irish businessman and CEO of DAA

- Born: County Cork, Ireland
- Education: University College Cork
- Occupations: Executive Chair and President, Manna
- Known for: CEO of DAA

Kenny Jacobs is an Irish businessman, born in Cork. He was Chief Marketing Officer of Ryanair and later CEO of daa plc, the operating company for Dublin Airport. He is currently the Executive Chair and President of Irish drone delivery startup Manna.

== Career ==
Jacobs attended school at Christian Brothers College in Cork, and graduated from University College Cork in 1997 with a degree in commerce.

He worked for the Metro Group, MoneySuperMarket, and Tesco in Ireland and the UK.

In 2014, he joined Ryanair, where he was the long-serving Chief Marketing Officer. When Jacobs arrived at Ryanair, it was as part of a move by the airline to – as CEO Michael O'Leary had put it – “stop unnecessarily pissing people off”.

He was announced as CEO of the DAA, which operates Dublin Airport, Cork Airport and various airport operations overseas, in November 2022, and commenced in January 2023. After tension with some members of the State company's board, in December 2025, Jacobs took a leave of absence from the DAA, pending the agreement of an exit package.

In July 2026, Jacobs took up the role of Executive Chair and President of Manna Drone Delivery, to help drive growth at the company.
