= National Consumer Agency =

Former State agency of the Department of Enterprise, Tourism and Employment overview
- Formed: 1 May 2007
- Dissolved: 31 October 2014
- Superseding Former State agency of the Department of Enterprise, Tourism and Employment: Competition and Consumer Protection Commission
- Jurisdiction: Ireland
- Headquarters: 4 Harcourt Road, Dublin 2
- Former State agency of the Department of Enterprise, Tourism and Employment executives: Nicole Saunders, Chief Executive; Steven Costello, Chairman
- Website: NCA website

The National Consumer Agency (NCA; Irish: Gníomhaireacht Náisiúnta Tomhaltoirí) was a statutory body enforcing consumer protection in Ireland from 2007 to 2014, when it amalgamated with the Competition Authority to form the Competition and Consumer Protection Commission.

== Establishment ==
The NCA was preceded by the office of Director of Consumer Affairs established by the Consumer Information Act 1978, which was a civil service office under the Minister for Industry, Commerce and Energy.

The NCA's origins can be traced to the setting up of the Consumer Strategy Group (CSG) in March 2004. The Consumer Protection Act 2007 implemented many of the group's recommendations, including replacing the Director of Consumer Affairs with an independent agency.

== Work ==
The CSG presented its report, “Making Consumers Count”, to the Minister for Enterprise, Trade and Employment, Micheál Martin, in April 2005. Among the report's key recommendations was the establishment of a new agency to champion consumer rights.

The NCA was set up on an interim basis in May 2005, and established on a statutory footing on 1 May 2007. Its first chief executive was Ann Fitzgerald, a former chief executive of the Irish Association of Investment Managers. She also chaired the Consumer Strategy Group.

The Irish government announced in its 2009 Budget on 14 October 2008 that the NCA would be amalgamated with the Competition Authority, as part of a rationalisation programme that will reduce the number of state agencies in the country by 41.

The NCA's campaigns included naming and shaming retailers who are caught breaking consumer law, preventing car dealers "clocking" second-hand cars (altering vehicles' odometers), and intervention in high-profile consumer disputes including ones with NTL Ireland, Aer Lingus and MCD Promoters These interventions resulted in speedy and satisfactory resolutions to the benefit of consumers.

http://www.irishtimes.com/news/health/consumer-agency-pulls-drug-price-survey-over-errors-1.1343496

The agency also carried out a series of price comparison surveys between leading supermarket chains, and cross-border comparisons of grocery items in stores' branches in the Republic and Northern Ireland.

On 2 September 2008 the agency published draft guidelines for the retail sector about how they should advertise price reductions, and related matters such as how long an item needs to be on sale at a higher price before advertising it with a reduced price comparison.

In December the same year there was a nationwide withdrawal of pigmeat from retail outlets after a dioxin contamination scare. The NCA successfully campaigned for full compensation for consumers after initial reluctance by some supermarket chains to refund products that were not their own brands.

On 18 June 2009, Minister for Finance, Brian Lenihan TD for the Irish Government established a single fully integrated regulatory institution, the Central Bank of Ireland.

As part of this change, the Financial Regulator's consumer information and education role was reassigned to the National Consumer Agency.

On 16 August 2010 the NCA published its response to the Department of Environment, Heritage and Local Government's Review of the Retail Planning Guidelines (RPGs) Issues Paper.

== ConsumerProperty.ie ==

In late September 2008 the National Consumer Agency launched a guide and a dedicated website, ConsumerProperty.ie, for people living in or planning on buying multi-unit dwellings. The website and guide had information and tips on consumers' rights and responsibilities if living in apartments, gated communities and other multi-unit developments.

The guide, "Buying and Living in a Multi-Unit Development Property" in Ireland, was available in booklet format or as a download from the website. It contained information on legal terms, Property management companies and agents, service charges, sinking funds, the function of developers, identifying defects (snagging), insurance and fire safety.

== Economiser ==

On 30 March 2010 the NCA launched the Economiser. This interactive tool advised consumers how much more or less they were spending than the average most relevant to them in Ireland, based on the profiling information they had provided.

This unique tool addressed five key expenditure areas:

- Groceries
- Energy
- TV and telecoms (other than mobile)
- Mobile phones
- Motoring – petrol and diesel costs

== Shop Smart ==
In April 2010 the NCA launched an interactive game set in a virtual shopping centre called Shop Smart. It tested young consumers' knowledge of their consumer rights and consumer issues in Ireland.

The game was aimed at Irish Junior Certificate and Leaving Certificate students who were studying Home Economics, Business Studies and Civic, Social and Political Education (CSPE).

== Amalgamation with the Competition Authority ==
In November 2008, the Government announced the amalgamation of the National Consumer Agency and the Competition Authority as part of a rationalisation of State agencies. On 31 March 2014 the Competition and Consumer Protection Bill was published. On 31 July Richard Bruton, TD, Minister for Jobs, Enterprise and Innovation announced that the legislation would commence and the new Competition and Consumer Protection Commission would be established on 31 October 2014.

The Competition and Consumer Protection Commission has a dual mandate to enforce competition and consumer law. Both organisations continued to perform their statutory functions until the merger was formed on 31 October 2014.

The Competition and Consumer Protection Commission is governed by an executive Chair and Membership structure. The Competition and Consumer Protection Act, 2014 allows for a Chair and between two and six Members.

The former Chair of the Competition Authority, Isolde Goggin, was appointed Chairperson of the Competition and Consumer Protection Commission on taking up her former role in 2011. Ms Goggin is supported in her role by the Members of the new Commission which include two former Members of the Competition Authority, Fergal O'Leary and Patrick Kenny, and the former Chief Executive of the National Consumer Agency, Karen O'Leary, all of whom were appointed Members-designate of the Competition and Consumer Protection Commission by the Minister for Jobs, Enterprise and Innovation upon taking up their current positions.
