= Inland Fisheries Ireland =

State agency in Ireland

Inland Fisheries Ireland (IFI; Irish: Iascach Intíre Éireann) is a state agency in Ireland responsible for fisheries management of freshwater fish and coastal fish within 12 nautical miles of the shore. A separate agency, Bord Iascaigh Mhara, is responsible for sea fisheries. In 2018, IFI's mission statement was: "To ensure the valuable natural resources of Inland Fisheries and Sea Angling are conserved, managed, developed and promoted in their own right to generate a positive return for the community and the environment". By 2024, this had changed to: "We are the environmental agency responsible for protecting, managing and conserving Ireland's inland fisheries and sea angling resources."

== Statutory history ==
Inland and coastal fishing rights are a form of private property. The Fisheries (Ireland) Act 1842 established regional Boards of Conservators for regulation and conservation. In 1951 Iontaobhas Iascaigh Intíre Ioncorportha (the Inland Fisheries Trust Incorporated) was established for publicly owned fisheries. The Fisheries Act 1980 established a Central Fisheries Board, which replaced Iontaobhas Iascaigh Intíre and the Boards of Conservators. The Inland Fisheries Act 2010 established Inland Fisheries Ireland as a replacement for the Central Fisheries Board. The restructure was partly a cost-saving rationalisation in line with Ireland's post-2008 austerity measures, and partly a shift of emphasis from economic exploitation towards environmental stewardship.

== Structure ==
There are six river basin districts, each with a separate IFI office: Eastern (office in Dublin); South Eastern (Clonmel); South Western (Macroom); Shannon River (Limerick); Western (Galway and Ballina) and North Western (Ballyshannon).

== See also ==
- The Irish Film Institute, also known as IFI
