= Discover Science & Engineering =

Discover Science & Engineering (DSE) is an Irish Government initiative that aims to increase interest in science, technology, engineering and mathematics (STEM) among students, teachers and members of the public in Ireland.

DSE’s mission is to contribute to Ireland's continued growth and development as a society that has an active and informed interest and involvement in science, engineering and technology.

Overall DSE objectives are to increase the numbers of students studying the physical sciences, promote a positive attitude toward careers in science, technology, engineering and mathematics and foster a greater understanding of science and its value to Irish society.

In September 2009, Discover Science & Engineering launched a redeveloped corporate website built on the open source CMS, WordPress.

DSE runs numerous initiatives, including:

- My Science Career
- Project Blogger
- Science.ie
- Science Week Ireland
- Greenwave
- Discover Primary Science
- Discover sensors

== See also ==
- Sentinus, equivalent in Northern Ireland
