= Vhi Healthcare =

Irish health insurance company

Voluntary Health Insurance Board
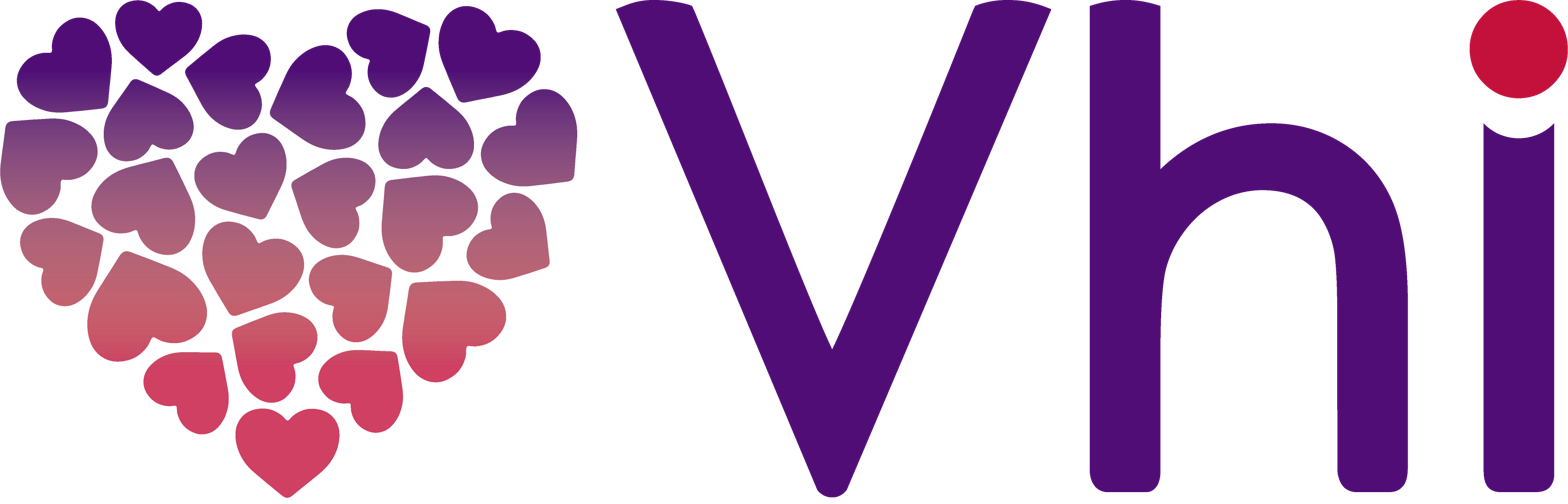
- Logo used since 2023
- Type: Statutory Corporation
- Industry: Insurance
- Founded: 12 February 1957; 69 years ago
- Headquarters: Purcellsinch, Kilkenny, Ireland
- Key people: Greg Sparks (Chairman); Brian Walsh (CEO)
- Products: Health insurance; Dental insurance; Life insurance; Travel insurance
- Revenue: €1.68 billion (2023)
- Number of employees: 1800 (2023)
- Website: www1.vhi.ie

The Voluntary Health Insurance Board (Irish: An Bord Árachais Sláinte Shaorálaigh) — which trades under the brand name Vhi Healthcare, and is still commonly referred to in Ireland as "The Vhi" – is the largest health insurance company in Ireland. It is a statutory corporation whose members are appointed by the Minister for Health. It is regulated by the Health Insurance Authority.

== Products ==
Vhi Healthcare offers a number of health insurance products. It also has Dental and Travel insurance. Vhi Healthcare has over 1.2 million members. Until 14 December 2006, its main rival in the market was BUPA Ireland but since BUPA's withdrawal, Irish based Laya Healthcare (formerly Quinn Healthcare) and Irish Life Health have emerged as Vhi's main competition. The current Healthcare business model is based on directly paying the consultant and hospital bills of its members. In February 2010 Vhi launched Vhi HomeCare a joint venture providing "Hospital in the Home" type services, it also provides urgent and planned care through its Health & Wellbeing provision services including Vhi 360 Healthcare Clinics.

== History ==
The Voluntary Health Insurance Board was created in 1957 under the Voluntary Health Insurance Act, 1957 by the Minister for Health Tom O'Higgins. This law has been amended but remains the primary legislation under which Vhi Healthcare operates.

The company held a monopoly in the health insurance market in Ireland until 1996, when BUPA entered the market. The company re-branded from "VHI – Voluntary Health Insurance" to "Vhi Healthcare" in the early 2000s (decade), although the Board's legal name has never been altered.

It is expected that the "statutory corporation" status of Vhi Healthcare will soon be changed to prepare it for more vigorous competition as it is often accused of being a virtual monopoly on private healthcare. While the privatisation of the company is not believed to be imminent, it was reported in the company's 2004 Annual Report that the Minister for Health would change the status of the board into a limited company owned by the state. The Voluntary Health Insurance (Amendment) Act 2008, allows the Board to transfer its health insurance functions to a wholly owned subsidiary which will be a private company limited by shares. However, it does not dissolve the Board itself, which will become a holding company. It also requires the health insurance company to achieve the level of reserves that any other authorised insurer is required to have, something it was previously exempt from.

== Proposed privatisation ==
The Irish Government announced on 27 May 2010 that the company was to be privatised within the next three years. Spokespeople from the Department of Health stated that they did not expect premiums to increase or the loss of any jobs at the 800 strong company. The state expected to invest large sums of money to allow the company gain a solvency ratio in line with regulations and other insurance companies. This coincided with new health risk equalisation measures which were to be rolled out from 2012. The Irish government were looking toward retaining Ireland's history of community rating in health insurance.

This decision was, ostensibly, overturned by the coalition government formed after the 2011 Irish General Election. In their Programme for Government, the Coalition committed itself to retaining VHI Healthcare as a state-owned corporation, serving as a public option within a universal health insurance system and modelled on the Dutch healthcare system.

== See also ==
- Health care in the Republic of Ireland
