= Great Southern Hotels =

Defunct Irish hotel chain

- Industry: Hospitality
- Founded: 1963; 63 years ago
- Defunct: 2006
- Fate: Broken up
- Owners: Aer Rianta (1990-2006); Córas Iompair Éireann (until 1990)

Great Southern Hotels was a chain of hotels owned by Irish semi-state airport operator Aer Rianta; and eventually broken up in 2006. The chain was bought by Aer Rianta from fellow semi-state company CIÉ for IE£10m in 1990.

CIÉ, as operators of the state's railways, had inherited the railway hotel chains of predecessor companies - primarily the Great Southern & Western Railway, which had used the name Great Southern Hotel for its properties since the 19th century, with the formalised Great Southern Hotels subsidiary being formed in 1963. CIÉ had developed further properties closer to roadways as private car transport increased; but closed other properties in the 1970s. Aer Rianta constructed hotels at its Dublin and Cork Airports, but did not extend the chain any further. It ran in to significant financial trouble in the latter era of CIÉ ownership, requiring a state bailout; and again before its dissolution by Aer Rianta

At the time of its break-up, the firm owned eight hotels - three at Aer Rianta owned airports and five in other locations. They also operated and part-owned the City Hotel in Derry

== Former Hotels ==
=== Open at time of closure ===
- Cork Airport - Built in 1999. Sold to CG Hotels and originally operated as a Park Inn franchise. Now the Cork Airport Hotel
- Derry - City Hotel, operated but only 25% owned
- Dublin Airport - Built in 1998. Sold to CG Hotels and now operated as a Radisson Blu.
- Galway Eyre Square - Built 1855. Now The Hardiman Hotel.
- Galway Corrib Great Southern - Built 1970. Sold but ceased to operate in 2007 Demolished in 2021
- Killarney - Built 1853. Now trading as the Great Southern Hotel again after being renamed to The Malton
- Rosslare, Wexford - Built 1969, did not sell at time of original breakup and ceased to operate. Derelict.
- Shannon Airport - Built 1963. Sold to CG Hotels and now a Park Inn
- Sneem - Parknasilla Hotel, built 1895, still operating

=== Disposed prior to closure ===
- Belfast - Russel Court Hotel, built 1972, closed 1976 after repeated bombings. Now apartments.
- Bundoran - Built 1894. Sold 1976. Has reverted to its original name of the Great Northern Hotel after the Great Northern Railway who built it. Still trading.
- Kenmare - Built 1897. Closed in the 1970s but has reopened as the Park Hotel
- Killarney Torc Hotel - Built 1968, closed in 2002. Has been demolished for a cinema
- Mulranny - sold in 1976. Now the Mulranny Park Hotel
- Sligo - built 1927. Sold in the 1970s, reopened as the Sligo Southern Hotel in 1983 and still trading

=== Unbuilt Proposals ===
- Donnybrook - 400 room hotel proposed on site of still operational Dublin Bus garage
