= G. W. Hemans =

Irish architect and engineer (1814–1885)

George Willoughby Hemans
- Born: 27 August 1814; St Asaph, Wales
- Died: 29 December 1885 (aged 71); London
- Occupations: Railway Engineer

George Willoughby Hemans (27 August 1814 – 29 December 1885) was an Irish railway engineer who designed several major railway schemes in Ireland and the UK during the mid 19th century.

== Life and Career ==
G. W. Hemans was born in St Asaph, North Wales, on 27 August 1814. He was the eldest son of Irish army officer Captain Alfred Hemans and poet Felicia Hemans (née Browne), who married in 1812.

Hemans studied for three years at a French military college (the Abbaye de Sorèze) in Sorèze, showing academic abilities in languages, science and drawing. He spent his early career with the Ordnance Survey as a pupil of London-based engineer Sir John Macneill, who later appointed him as resident engineer for the Dublin end of the railway to Drogheda, where he supervised the first iron lattice bridges in Ireland.

In 1845, after his next commission, to take charge of a railway line between Dublin and Cork, he was appointed chief engineer by the directors of the Midland Great Western Railway of Ireland to prepare plans for a line to Mullingar and Longford.

On the recommendation of Hermes, the railway directors appointed William Dargan as a contractor. The Mullingar to Galway railway line was completed in August 1851, five months ahead of schedule and with funds to spare. A feasibility report by Hemans led to the creation of a railway hotel in Galway, known today as The Hardiman hotel.

Hemans worked as an engineer for the Midland Great Western Railway until 1865.

In 1854, Hemans moved to London, where his railway engineering works included the Vale of Clwyd, the East Grinstead and Groombridge and Tunbridge Wells, and the Tewkesbury and Malvern lines.

He became a member of the Institution of Civil Engineers in 1837 becoming a member of its council in 1856, and later vice-president. He was also a member of the Institution of Civil Engineers of Ireland from 1845, serving as council member 1846–1849, 1860–61, 1885; vice-president 1850–1856; president 1857–1859; and honorary member from 1 December 1881. He was a member of the Royal Institute of Architects 1840–1852 and the Royal Zoological Society, acting as council member 1850–1853.

Hemans moved to New Zealand in 1870, where he was appointed engineer-in-chief for Canterbury Province, and later for all New Zealand.

In September 1872, he suffered a stroke while staying in Wales which left him paralyzed and incapable of speech and writing for the rest of his life.

He died on the 29th of December 1885 at his home in London.
