= Health and Safety Authority =

Regulatory body

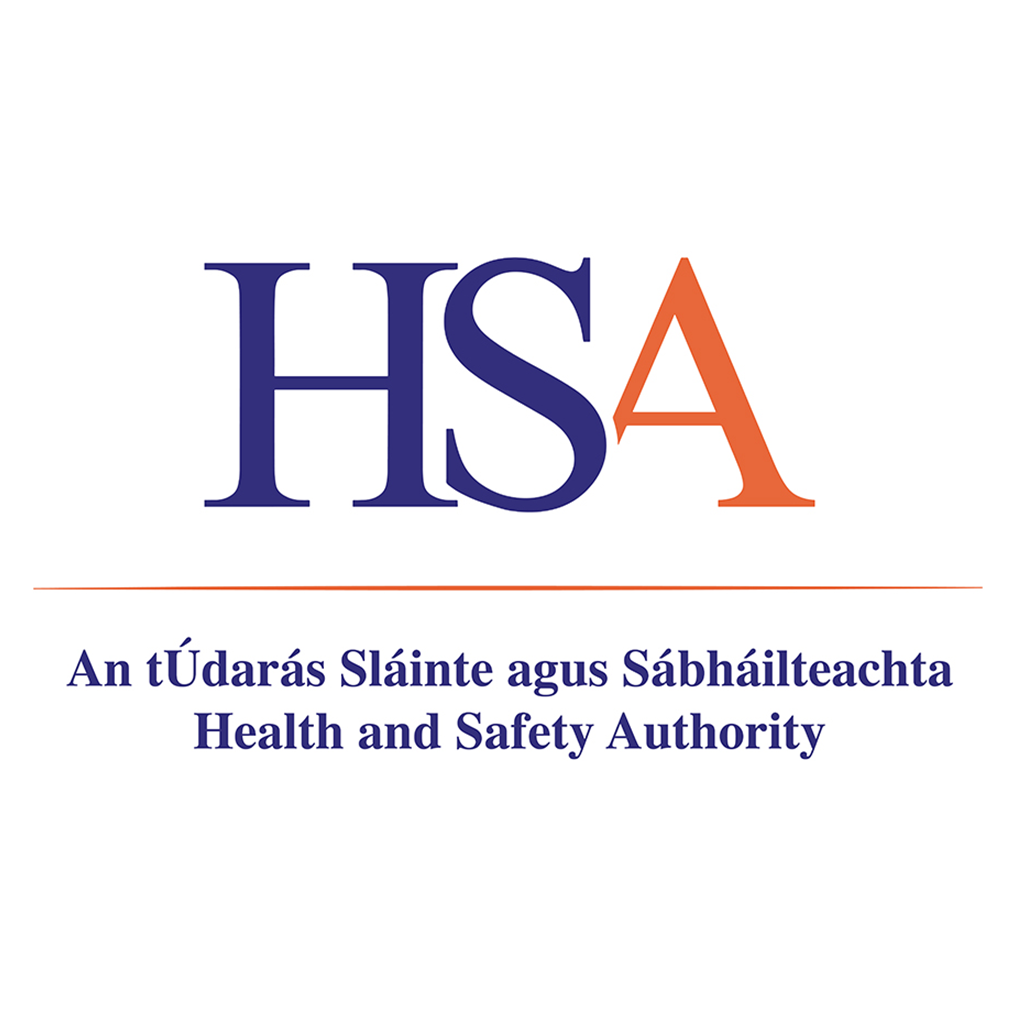

State agency of the Department of Enterprise, Tourism and Employment overview
- Formed: 1989
- Jurisdiction: Ireland
- Headquarters: The Metropolitan Building, James Joyce Street, Dublin 1
- State agency of the Department of Enterprise, Tourism and Employment executives: Mark Cullen, Chief Executive (as of 2025); Patricia Byron, Chairperson (as of 2025)
- Key document: Safety, Health and Welfare at Work Act, 1989
- Website: HSA website

Warning notices about worker health and safety at the Corlis Point lighthouse.

The Health and Safety Authority (HSA) is a state-sponsored body in Ireland which has responsibility for occupational health and safety. Its role is to secure health and safety at work. It was established under the Safety, Health and Welfare at Work Act, 1989 and reports to the Minister for Enterprise, Tourism and Employment. The HSA, which operates from its headquarters in Dublin, also has offices in Kilkenny, Athlone, Cork, Galway, Limerick, Sligo and Waterford.

The HSA has overall responsibility for the administration and enforcement of health and safety at work in Ireland. It monitors compliance with legislation at the workplace and can take enforcement action – including prosecutions which can result in fines or imprisonment. It also promotes education, training, and research in the field of health and safety.

Occupational safety and health policy is determined by a twelve-member board. The appointment of the board is a function of the Minister for Enterprise, Tourism and Employment under the Safety, Health and Welfare at Work Act, 1989.

In 2016, the Irish Times reported that workplace safety inspections, undertaken by the HSA, had dropped from 15,340 in 2011 to 10,719 in 2014. The reduction in inspections was attributed to "staff cutbacks" at the HSA.

The agency, which collates data on accidents and injuries at work, noted a 61% increase in work-related fatalities during 2025.
