= National Treatment Purchase Fund =

Public health funding authority in Ireland

The National Treatment Purchase Fund (NTPF) is an Irish government body which was established to decrease waiting lists in the Irish public healthcare system.

The Fund was established in May 2004 by order of the Minister for Health and Children, Micheál Martin. Its remit was extended under the Nursing Homes Support Scheme Act 2009. The NTPF reduced waiting times for procedures from between 2 and 5 years in 2002 to an average of 2.4 months in 2009.

== See also ==
- Healthcare in the Republic of Ireland
