= DAA (company) =

Irish commercial semi-state airport company

daa plc
- Native name: úabác cpt
- Company type: Public
- Founded: 1937 (as Aer Rianta Teoranta)
- Headquarters: Dublin Airport, Ireland
- Website: http://www.daa.ie/

DAA plc (styled "daa") (Irish: ÚABÁC cpt), previously Dublin Airport Authority (Údarás Aerfort Bhaile Átha Cliath), is a commercial semi-state airport company in Ireland. The company owns and operates Dublin Airport and Cork Airport. Its other subsidiaries include the travel retail business Aer Rianta International and DAA International.

DAA's head office is in the original passenger terminal on the grounds of Dublin Airport.

DAA owned and operated Shannon Airport, until it became a separate state-owned airport in 2012. The company also owned Great Southern Hotels, which had nine sites throughout the island of Ireland. The hotels were sold in 2006.

== History ==
=== Aer Rianta ===
Aer Rianta logo until 2004.

Aer Rianta was founded in 1937 as Aer Rianta Teoranta and the name is derived from the Irish language for "air ways" or "air tracks"; Teoranta is the Irish word for Limited. Aer Rianta was to serve as a holding company for the national airline and to promote aviation generally.

In 1947, Aer Rianta started the duty-free shop concept in the Shannon Airport and are credited with the invention of duty-free shops in airports. Aer Rianta was the principal shareholder of Aer Lingus during the airline's early days, until 1966.

Aer Rianta began managing the Dublin Airport in the 1940s. Under the Air Navigation and Transport Act of 1950, Aer Rianta was given legal responsibility for the airport. In 1954, Prof. Patrick Lynch was appointed chairman of Aer Rianta. He retired from the position in 1975.

In 1966, the passage of the Air Companies Act enabled the transfer of Aer Lingus shares to the Minister of Finance, and separate boards were appointed to each company. A general manager of Aer Rianta was appointed in 1968. On 1 April 1969, Cork and Shannon Airports became the responsibility of the company.

In 1988, Aer Rianta International (ARI) was created to pursue international potential to the company's growth not related to Irish airport management – for example, opening Russia's first duty free in Moscow in 1988. In 1998, Aer Rianta Teoranta became Aer Rianta cpt and kept this name until 2004.

=== Dublin Airport Authority/DAA ===
In 2004, the Oireachtas passed the State Airports Act, 2004. This changed the company name from Aer Rianta cpt to Dublin Airport Authority plc, and established Shannon Airport Authority plc and Cork Airport Authority plc. The three new authorities had power to formulate business plans for their respective airports, however they would not take charge of running the airports until a further date to be determined by the Minister for Transport, which by law could not be before 1 May 2005. As of 2008 this had yet to take place. Significant outstanding issues to be resolved include competitiveness and debit restructuring.

The company also retains its significant shareholdings in foreign airports such as Düsseldorf and Larnaca, through its wholly owned subsidiary ARI, Aer Rianta International.

The State Airports Act was heavily criticised by Noel Hanlon, the outgoing chairman of Aer Rianta, and by the company's unions, who believed it a precursor to privatisation. No act to privatise Dublin Airport Authority or any of the airports has been passed however.

The Dublin Airport Authority was officially renamed DAA with effect from November 2014.

In 2016, DAA paid a €18.3m dividend to the State, its first since 2009. In September 2017, Dalton Philips was appointed as its CEO. In May 2018, Basil Geoghegan was named chairman of the company. In January 2023, Kenny Jacobs was appointed as its CEO.

In 2019, DAA saw record-breaking passenger numbers. The DAA was chosen for the Special Achievement in Geographic Information Systems (GIS) award ahead of 300,000 global candidates, using mapping software from GIS expert ESRI Ireland and working with the company to develop a new system to manage assets at the airport.

In 2020, Covid was “the most serious crisis that has ever faced the international aviation sector and our business,” according to then CEO Dalton Philips. By June 2020, the pandemic had already cost DAA €160m in lost revenue, with passengers decreased by 99%. The DAA implemented a series of public health measures to protect and enhance the health and safety of passengers and staff as a result of COVID-19. In October 2020, Dublin Airport anti-COVID-19 measures received accreditation from global industry body Airports Council International (ACI).

DAA returned to profit in 2023.

=== Great Southern Hotels ===
In 1990, the nine Great Southern Hotels were purchased from Córas Iompair Éireann, and sold again in 2006. Edward Holdings, a company controlled by Galway businessman Gerry Barrett bought the Killarney, Eyre Square and Corrib hotels, while Dublin developer Bernard McNamara has bought the Parknasilla hotel in County Kerry. A company controlled by Ronan McArdle, Frank McArdle, Alan McIntosh and the Walsh brothers has acquired the three airport hotels at Dublin, Cork and Shannon.

== Airports and operations ==
=== Dublin Airport ===
Dublin Airport is the state's largest airport. It handled 31.5m passengers in 2018. It had record-breaking passenger numbers in 2019. Dublin Airport's connectivity increased by 59% in the five years to the end of 2018, making it the second-fastest growing major airport in Europe in terms of connectivity. In October 2020, Dublin Airport anti-COVID-19 measures received accreditation from global industry body Airports Council International (ACI).

In 2022, Dublin Airport's north runway came into operation . The runway cost €320 million, opening on time and on budget at no cost to the taxpayer.

A court case arose in 2014 regarding a proposed contract to be let by daa for a range of airport facilities services at Dublin Airport. OCS One Complete Solution, the incumbent contractor, challenged the daa's decision to award a new contract to Maybin Support Services Ltd., which led to a High Court hearing. Provisions under EU utilities procurement regulations, which include procurement in the transport sector, require an option for unsuccessful tenderers to be able to challenge an award decision if they have suitable grounds and provide for an automatic suspension of the new contract award process until the challenge has been resolved. This was the first occasion when the High Court ruled on a request for this automatic suspension to be lifted. The court ruled in favour of leaving the suspension in place.

=== Cork Airport ===
- Cork Airport is the state's second largest airport.
- Handled just over 3 million passengers in 2024.

=== Other operations ===
Aer Rianta International (part of DAA) operates travel retail/duty free outlets in 10 countries, with stores in countries such as Canada, Cyprus, India and New Zealand. It also has outlets in several countries in the Middle East and in 2015 won a 10-year contract to operate duty-free stores at the new Midfield Terminal Building in Abu Dhabi International Airport.

In 2016, DAA International won the contract to manage the new Terminal 5 at King Khaled International Airport in Riyadh, Saudi Arabia.

In 2022, DAA international won a multimillion-euro contract to manage Jeddah Airport in Saudi Arabia for five years.

IN 2022, ANA Aeroportos de Portugal appointed Aer Rianta International as its partner to manage duty-free and duty-paid shops in eight locations.

== Dublin Airport Delays ==
On 1 June 2022, then daa chief executive Dalton Philips was called to appear before the Oireachtas transport committee. following multiple days of prolonged queues, more than 1,000 passengers missing a flight in one day and providing no guarantee that such queues would not return was described by Minister of State in the Department of Finance, Seán Fleming as a "reflection of bad management, full stop". The Taoiseach said the delays are "unacceptable for passengers and their families."

In May 2021, Philips had defended the decision to lay off 2,000 of daa's 7,750 staff, despite the State backstop in place at the time as necessary stating "if you had that [bailout] mentality, it’s all over...we have to carry our own water." The decision to fire so many staff was criticised in June 2022 in Dáil Éireann, with deputies claiming that the resultant airport delays had made Ireland in to a "laughing stock".
