= Competition and Consumer Protection Commission =

Irish competition regulator

- An Coimisiún um Iomaíocht agus Cosaint Tomhaltóirí

State agency of the Department of Enterprise, Tourism and Employment overview
- Formed: 31 October 2014
- Preceding agencies: Competition Authority; National Consumer Agency
- Jurisdiction: Ireland
- Headquarters: Bloom House Railway Street Dublin 1 D01 C576
- Minister responsible: Peter Burke, TD, Department of Enterprise, Tourism and Employment
- Deputy Minister responsible: Dara Calleary, TD, Minister of State for Trade Promotion, Digital and Company Regulation
- State agency of the Department of Enterprise, Tourism and Employment executive: Brian McHugh, Chairperson
- Key document: Competition and Consumer Protection Act, 2014
- Website: CCPC website

The Competition and Consumer Protection Commission (CCPC) is the competition regulator in Ireland. It is an Irish state agency established in 2014, combining the previous functions of the Competition Authority and the National Consumer Agency. The amalgamation was effected by the Fine Gael–Labour coalition government as part of a reduction in state spending in response to the post-2008 Irish economic downturn; the new body also has increased powers.

The Competition and Consumer Protection Act 2014 led to the establishment of the CCPC after it dissolved two bodies and transferred their powers to the CCPC.The CCPC does not intervene or become involved in individual disputes between consumers and sellers of goods or providers of services. It carries out several functions including the following.

1. Informing the consumer: The CCPC is the statutory office responsible for providing consumers with information on their rights. Consumers can interact and look for advice on its website, via a helpline and on social media. The CCPC also produces a newsletter which you can subscribe to on its website.

2. Enforcing consumer law. The CCPC issues prohibition orders (a notice to a business to immediately cease an illegal act), compliance notices (a written notice to stop a certain practice and obey the law by a certain date), issue on-the-spot fines for offences relating to price display, and 'name and shame' businesses by publishing non-compliant trader names.

3. Conducting research into consumer issues The CCPC publishes research on consumer behaviours. In 2017, it found out that 41 per cent of consumers surveyed had switched at least one service provider in the last 12 months (for example, gas, electricity or bank). The aim of the research was to show consumers how much they could save by swapping rather than remaining loyal to their provider.

4. Educating the consumer. The CCPC website has lots of tools which aim to help consumers make more informed choices. It uses financial calculators to allow consumers to compare the costs of mortgages, credit cards, loans and other products from different providers.

5. Advising the Irish government on consumer issues The CCPC advises the Irish government in relation to consumer protection. If it is concerned that consumers need greater protection in certain areas that could be aided by changes to Irish laws, the CCPC will advise them of this.

6. Protecting consumers from firms dominating a market. The CCPC examines mergers and acquisitions to ensure there is enough competition in Ireland. A lack of competition could affect prices or the quality of services provided to consumers
