= Sustainable Energy Authority of Ireland =

Governmental body in Dublin, Ireland

- Údarás Fuinnimh Inmharthana na hÉireann

State agency overview
- Formed: 2002
- Jurisdiction: Ireland
- Website: www.seai.ie

The Sustainable Energy Authority of Ireland (SEAI) (Irish: Údarás Fuinnimh Inmharthana na hÉireann) is an Irish governmental body established to promote and aid in the development of sustainable energy in Ireland.

== History ==
The SEAI was founded as the national energy agency of Ireland under the Sustainable Energy Act 2002 by the government, with the goal of increasing the use and development of affordable sustainable energy in Ireland. It is financed by Ireland’s EU Structural Funds Programme, which funded by both the Irish government and the EU.

== Projects and initiatives ==
The main objectives of the SEAI as a statutory body is to ensure the implementation and adoption of energy efficiency across all Irish sectors, as well as the development of new technology for use in with renewable energy sources and the decarbonisation of the Irish energy supply. It also funds and supports research into new technologies and their deployment in sectors including bioenergy, electric vehicles, the combination of heat and power systems, and ocean energy. Among their large public initiatives are the Better Energy Communities and Sustainable Energy Communities programmes aimed at domestic and community energy and sustainability programmes.

=== National retrofitting plan ===
The SEAI is the body overseeing Ireland's national retrofitting of domestic and business buildings to increase energy efficiency and the move away from fossil fuels as heat sources.

=== Offshore renewable energy ===
The SEAI is engaged in supporting the offshore renewable energy sector in Ireland. It does so by advising on government policy development, investing in grant schemes and the creation of test sites, and actively implementing the Irish Offshore Renewable Energy Development Plan (OREDP). With the Marine Institute, the SEAI it manages Ireland’s Ocean Energy Portal, an information portal for those engaged in the development of the marine renewable energy sector. Among the projects the SEAI has supported with EU funding are:

- OPIN (Ocean Power Innovation Network)
- AFLOWT (Accelerating market uptake of Floating Offshore Wind Technology)
- OceanSET (Support to the Realisation of the Ocean Energy Implementation Plan of the SET-Plan)
