= Public service of the Republic of Ireland =

All the public administration within the Irish government

The public service (Irish: seirbhís phoiblí) of Ireland refers to the entirety of public administration within the state government apparatus. The Department of Public Expenditure, Infrastructure, Public Service Reform and Digitalisation defines the Irish public service as consisting of:

- Civil Service
- Defence sector
- Education sector
- Justice sector
- Health sector
- Local authorities
- Non-commercial state agencies (NCSAs).

Two-thirds of public service employees work in the health and education sectors (doctors, nurses, healthcare assistants (HCAs), consultants, teachers, classroom assistants, etc.).

== Civil Service ==
The Civil Service of Ireland is the collective term for the permanent staff of the departments of state and certain state agencies who advise and work for the Government of Ireland. It consists of two broad components, the Civil Service of the Government and the Civil Service of the State. Whilst these two components are largely theoretical, they do have some fundamental operational differences.

=== The Civil Service of the Government ===
The Civil Service of the Government advises and carries out the work of the Government, through the various departments of state, of which there are eighteen; each in the control of one "Minister of the Government". The senior civil servant in a Department is its Secretary General (often referred to as "departmental head" in the media). The head of the Civil Service, currently John Callinan, is both Secretary General of the Department of the Taoiseach (analogous to a cabinet department in other countries) and Secretary General to the Government.

Some departments of state liaise closely with other parts of the public sector:

- With the defence sector: Department of Defence
- With the education sector: Department of Education and Youth; Department of Further and Higher Education, Research, Innovation and Science
- With the justice sector: Department of Justice, Home Affairs and Migration
- With the health sector: Department of Health
- With local authorities: Department of Housing, Local Government and Heritage

=== The Civil Service of the State ===
The Civil Service of the State is a relatively small component of the overall Civil Service, and its members are expected to be absolutely independent of the government, in addition to normal political independence. The Civil Service of the State typically comprises specialised agencies. The Revenue Commissioners, Central Statistics Office, Office of Public Works, Comptroller and Auditor General, Courts Service of Ireland, Director of Public Prosecutions, Legal Aid Board and Prisons Service are all considered to be part of the Civil Service of the State, as opposed to being non-commercial semi-state bodies, like Fáilte Ireland and IDA Ireland. Other offices are also prescribed under the Civil Service of the State.

The largest reform of the Civil Service occurred in 1984 when the abolition of the Department of Posts and Telegraphs led to the halving of Civil Service numbers. The affected personnel, mainly postal and telecommunications workers, were transferred to An Post and Telecom Éireann, respectively. As of December 2022, there were 47,658 people employed in the national Civil Service.

== Defence sector ==
The defence sector refers to the total number of personnel of the Irish Defence Forces, which consists of the Irish Army, Naval Service and Air Corps. Personnel numbers for each of the three services is as follows:

- Irish Army: 7,821
- Naval Service: 1,084
- Air Corps: 748

State spending on defence totalled €895 million for 2016.

== Education sector ==
The education sector represents the second largest sector of the Irish public service, with 96,432 employees working in primary, post-primary and third level institutes. The breakdown of this figure is as follows:

- Primary schools: 44,595
- Post-Primary: 34,470
- Third-Level: 17,367, the majority of which are in universities (9,991) and Institutes of Technology (7,249).

Public spending in 2016 on education totalled just over €8.3 billion.

== Health sector ==
The health sector in Ireland makes up the largest part of the Irish public service, with a total staff of 105,885. Health makes up 35% of the total number of workers in the national public service. The Health Service Executive is the largest component of Ireland's health sector, with 67,145 employed as part of it.

- Health Service Executive: 67,145
- Voluntary Agencies (Non Acute): 14,914
- Voluntary Hospitals: 23,825

Spending in the health sector totalled just over €13.6 billion in 2016.

== Justice sector ==
The justice sector refers to policing in Ireland, specifically the Garda Síochána, which has a workforce, not counting civilian staff of 13,261. Spending on policing amounted to €1.4 billion in 2016.

== Local authorities ==
Local government in Ireland is undertaken by 31 local authorities, each one corresponding to a city or county. Employees of local authorities are considered to be part of the Irish public service, with funding for local government provided mainly by central government, as well the local property tax. There are approximately 27,188 employed for the 31 local authorities across Ireland, with Dublin City Council with the largest employee count of all the councils with 5,330 staff.

== Non-commercial state agencies ==
Non-commercial state agencies, or government agencies are autonomously run state agencies assigned with a specific task, and typically free to carry out their responsibilities free of government or ministerial interference. State agencies are, for the most part, established through legislation by the Dáil and overseen by the relevant committee of the Oireachtas. Examples of such state agencies include the Arts Council, Bord Iascaigh Mhara, Health Information and Quality Authority, Higher Education Authority and Transport Infrastructure Ireland

In 2016 there were 12,616 employed in various non-commercial state agencies, with the largest by employee being the Child and Family Agency with 3,554 staff.

== Public service numbers ==
1. Civil Service (12.3%)
2. Defence (3.14%)
3. Education (32.3%)
4. Health (34.8%)
5. Justice (4.36%)
6. Local Authorities (8.93%)
7. NCSA (4.14%)

| Sector | Employees |
|---|---|
| Civil Service | 37,523 |
| Defence | 9,549 |
| Education | 98,450 |
| Health | 105,885 |
| Justice | 13,261 |
| Local authorities | 27,188 |
| NCSA | 12,616 |
| Total | 304,472 |

== See also ==
- Government of Ireland
