= Project Blogger =

Project Blogger is an educational initiative in Ireland by Discover Science & Engineering (DSE). It provides blogging tools and an online space for secondary school students and their teachers to create blogs about their school science experiments and science interests.

Through the blogs, the students can share their experiences about science with their classmates, as well as with students from other schools across Ireland.

The scheme was piloted in the 2007–08 academic year and was extended the following year.

DSE has also teamed up with Scifest for students to use Project Blogger in their SciFest projects. The students use their online science diaries to store ongoing project results, images, ideas, graphs, video and discussions.
