= Bord Iascaigh Mhara =

Irish fishing and aquaculture government agency

State Agency of the Department of Agriculture, Food and the Marine overview
- Formed: 1 July 1952; 74 years ago
- Preceding State Agency of the Department of Agriculture, Food and the Marine: Irish Sea Fisheries Association
- Jurisdiction: Ireland
- Headquarters: Crofton Road, Dún Laoghaire, County Dublin
- Employees: 126 (2025)
- State Agency of the Department of Agriculture, Food and the Marine executive: Caroline Bocquel, Chief executive
- Key document: Sea Fisheries Act, 1952
- Website: http://www.bim.ie

Bord Iascaigh Mhara or BIM (Irish pronunciation: [ˌbˠoːɾˠd̪ˠ ˈiəsˠkəj ˈwaɾˠə]; meaning "Sea Fisheries Board") is the Irish state agency responsible for developing the Irish marine fishing and aquaculture industries. Originally established under the Sea Fisheries Act, 1952, the organistion took over several roles of the previous Irish Sea Fisheries Association. BIM provides resources to the fishing industry, including in aquaculture, as well as providing information and promoting seafood to consumers. It was originally involved in factory construction and training, and also operated boatyards in Baltimore, Dingle, and Killybegs.

The organisation, which had approximately 500 employees in the 1970s, had over 260 staff members by 2007. As of 2025, BIM had 126 staff.

BIM, which also has offices elsewhere in the country, is headquartered in Dún Laoghaire, County Dublin.

== See also ==
- Inland Fisheries Ireland, agency responsible for fishing in Ireland, up to 12 nautical miles from shore
