= Tusla =

Independent Irish government agency

Child and Family Agency
- An Ghníomhaireacht um Leanaí agus an Teaghlach
- Logo is Irish with bilingual organisation's title

State agency overview
- Formed: 1 January 2014
- Preceding State agency: Health Service Executive
- Jurisdiction: Ireland
- Headquarters: The Brunel Building, Heuston South Quarter, Saint John's Road West, Dublin 8, D08 X01F
- Employees: 4,597.75 (2020)
- Minister responsible: Minister for Children, Disability and Equality
- State agency executives: Kate Duggan, Chief Executive; Pat Rabbitte, Chairperson
- Parent department: Department of Children, Disability and Equality
- Website: tusla.ie

The Child and Family Agency (Irish: An Ghníomhaireacht um Leanaí agus an Teaghlach), known as Tusla, is an independent Irish agency created by the Child and Family Agency Act 2013 and answerable to the Minister for Children, Disability and Equality. Its functions were previously distributed among the Health Service Executive's Children & Family Services, the Family Support Agency, and the National Educational Welfare Board. The name Tusla is intended to invoke the Irish words tús (beginning) and lá (day).
