= The Big Bang Fair =

The Big Bang UK Young Scientists and Engineers Fair was founded 2009. The Big Bang Fair is the United Kingdom’s largest celebration of STEM (science, technology, engineering and maths) for young people, and is one of the largest youth events in the UK. The Fair takes place annually in June.

The Big Bang programme exists to bring science and engineering to life for young people. The Big Bang mission is to showcase surprising possibilities and connect young people to inspiring role models in STEM.

It is led by EngineeringUK in partnership with over 200 organisations across government, industry, education and the wider science and engineering community.

Since 2014, The Big Bang Fair has been hosted in the National Exhibition Centre in Birmingham. The Big Bang Fair consists of hands-on activities, workshops and live shows, designed to inform and inspire young people aged 11 to 14 to learn more about careers in science, engineering and technology.

In 2024, The Big Bang Fair will take place on 19 to 21 June.

== Criticism ==
The Big Bang Fair has been criticised by NGOs such as the Campaign Against the Arms Trade and Friends of the Earth due to the heavy involvement of arms manufacturers and fossil fuel companies at the event. The event has been described as being a PR stunt rather than being a genuine attempt to educate children and get them involved in STEM in future. Furthermore it has also been criticised for presenting a "distorted view of the value of science" in reference to the involvement of arms manufacturers and oil companies.
