= Aer Rianta International =

Airport holding and management company

- The company's official logo as of 2025.
- Company type: Public
- Founded: 1988
- Headquarters: Dublin Airport, Dublin, County Dublin, Ireland
- Website: http://www.ari.ie

Aer Rianta International cpt (ARI) is an airport and retail holding and management company, registered in Dublin and with its head office at Dublin Airport. ARI is a subsidiary of Ireland's state-owned DAA.

The company was established in 1988 as part of Aer Rianta (now DAA). The airport division holds a 20% stake in Düsseldorf Airport. It formerly held stakes in Hamburg Airport, which it sold in December 2006 and Birmingham Airport, which it sold in September 2007. The airport retail division designs, manages and operates duty free and duty paid airport retail outlets in Europe, the Middle East, India, New Zealand and the Americas.

ARI has stores in Barbados, Bahrain, Canada, Cyprus, India, Lebanon, New Zealand, Montenegro, Qatar, Indonesia and Oman and also operates retail outlets under the brand: "The Loop" at Dublin Airport and Cork Airport. It has a managed turnover of over $1 billion and employs over 3,000 people worldwide.

In March 2007, Aer Rianta International and Barbados-based Caribbean Airways announced a new joint venture retail business named CaribbeanAri Inc. The venture is to be debuted in Barbados' Grantley Adams International Airport. The business will feature a Runway brand of luggage, cosmetics, clothing, chocolates, liquor and tobacco stores.

In 2012, the company had sales of €1.2 billion.

In February 2018, John Heffernan resigned from the ARI board. In May, Jack McGowan left the position of chief executive. In July, Ray Hernan was appointed chief executive of ARI and Anthony Kenny was appointed deputy CEO and chief financial officer.
