= EngineeringUK =

Organization based in London, the United Kingdom

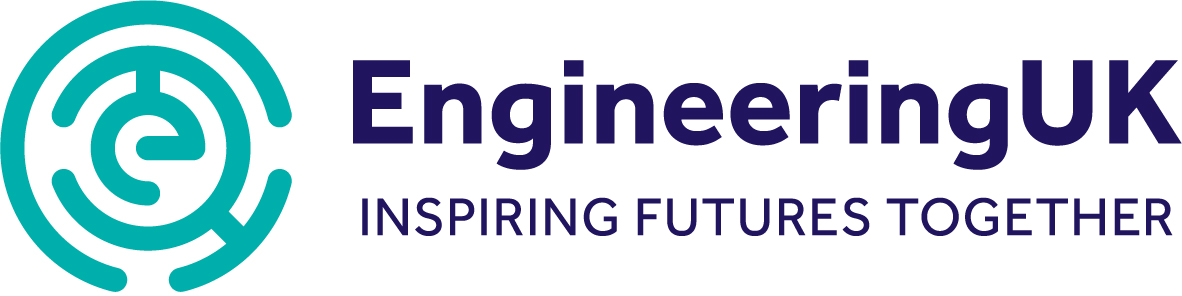
- Founded: 14 February 2001
- Type: Professional Organisation
- Purpose: Engineering and technology inspiration
- Location(s): London, EC3; United Kingdom
- Region served: United Kingdom
- Key people: Dr Hilary Leevers (Chief Executive) Iain Conn (Chair)
- Website: www.engineeringuk.com

EngineeringUK is an independent, not-for-profit organization. The engineering and technology sectors in the UK need a stronger, more representative workforce. EngineeringUK with a mission to drive change so more young people choose engineering and technology careers. They work with hundreds of organisations across business, education, government and the engineering community so they can grow the future talent pool. EngineeringUK's purpose is to drive change so more young people choose engineering and technology careers.

Previously known as the Engineering and Technology Board (ETB), EngineeringUK was founded on 14 February 2001. EngineeringUK are part of the National Engineering Policy Centre.

== Activities ==
Their work centres around four areas:

1 Research and evidence: establish the composition of the current engineering and technology workforce, the future workforce needs and how to address them. They look at STEM education pathways as well as young people's attitudes. All evidence is available on their website.

2 Leadership: grow the collective impact of all engineering and technology inspiration and career activities with young people of school age. Members and Professional Engineering Institutions support the collective impact, as do The Tomorrow's Engineers Code community. All engagements, best practices, case studies and resources are free and available across EngineeringUK's websites.

3 Activities for schools: a wide range of activities to encourage more, and more diverse, young people into engineering and technology roles. EngineeringUK run the Big Bang programme of activities, including a national competition and the UK's largest annual science fair for young people, as well as the Climate Schools Programme – developed to link future skills needs with sustainability. EngineeringUK is the lead organizer of the annual The Big Bang UK Young Scientists & Engineers Fair.

4 Advocacy: address policy and delivery challenges in STEM and careers education and workforce planning for engineering and tech, and support change. EngineeringUK advocates for policy improvements in engineering and tech careers provision, vocational routes into engineering, STEM teacher recruitment and pathways into the sector, particularly apprenticeships and T Levels.
