= Science Week Ireland =

Annual science event in Ireland

Science Week logo

Science Week Ireland is an annual week-long event in Ireland each November, celebrating science in our everyday lives. Science Week is an initiative of Science Foundation Ireland (SFI) It is the largest science festival in the country, engaging tens of thousands of members of the general public in workshops, science shows, talks, laboratory demonstrations, science walks and other science-related events. Science Week is a collaboration of events involving industry, colleges, schools, libraries, teachers, researchers and students throughout Ireland.

Science Week supports Science Foundation Ireland’s mission to catalyse, inspire and guide the best in science, technology, engineering and maths (STEM) education and public engagement. The ultimate aim of this effort is that Ireland will have the most engaged and scientifically informed public by 2020 as outlined in Science Foundation Ireland’s strategy Agenda 2020. This also aligns to the national science innovation strategy, Innovation 2020.

== History ==
Over the years, Science Week Ireland has grown from a small pilot initiative to a large promotional and event engine to its current identity as a recognised vehicle for regional activity supported by a national promotional campaign. In 1995, a National Science week was organised by the Royal Dublin Society and a number of other organisations to inform the general public about science. The first Science Week organised by Forfás was held in 1996. If was run by Forfás on behalf of the Office of Science and Technology at the Department of Jobs, Enterprise and Innovation under the name 'Information Technology and Science Week'. The week aimed to raise general awareness of the benefits of science and information technology to people, young and old throughout society. In 1997 it was renamed Science Week. Professional bodies, voluntary groups, colleges, businesses and the public sector combined to organise 50 events countrywide. Events included conferences, lectures, interactive exhibitions, debates, and competitions for primary school students.

SFI took over Science Week from the Forfás Discover Science and Engineering programme in 2012. Science Week continued to grow and develop over the following years into what it represents today, a week-long celebration of STEM public engagement, enhancing the public’s interest in STEM and enabling them to see the relevance of STEM to their daily lives.

=== 1996 ===
In 1996, Forfás organised the first Information Technology and Science Week beginning on 25 November.

=== 1997 ===
Science week ran between 10 and 16 November, and was again organised by Forfás. It was launched by minister Noel Treacy in Galway. Events included answering scientific questions for school children and a Speakathon organised by the Irish Research Scientists' Association.

=== 1998 ===
Science Week 1998 ran from 1 to 8 November. Events included talks in public libraries and another Speakathon. Forfás sought feedback on the running of Science Week and it was also externally evaluated.

=== 2007 ===
Science Week 2007 took place between 11–18 November and the theme was "Surrounded by Science". The programme of events set out to illustrate that behind the everyday objects in our lives is a great inventor, scientist or engineer. This included a series of lectures which featured Craig Johnston, inventor of the Adidas Predator; Joe F. Edwards, Jr., former NASA astronaut; and Dr. Sheila Willis, Director of the Forensic Science Laboratory.

2007 was the eleventh year of Science Week and saw an estimated 95,000 people attend lectures, exhibitions and workshops throughout the country.

=== 2008 ===
The 2008 Science Week took place between 11–16 November. The theme was 'Science – Shaping Our World' which celebrates the International Year of Planet Earth.

The guest lecturers include Professor Aubrey Manning, distinguished zoologist and broadcaster; Gerry Johnston, director of Special Effects Ireland; Dr. Cynthia Breazeal, Associate Professor at Massachusetts Institute of Technology; Stephen Attenborough of Virgin Galactic; and Patrick Collison, Irish Young Scientist of the Year winner 2005. These can be viewed on YouTube.

=== 2009 ===
Science Week 2009 took place between 8–15 November. The theme was 'Science – Inspiring Creativity and Innovation’, which links to the European Year of Creativity and Innovation. In the summer of 2009, DSE launched a Twitter account for the latest news on Science Week. A lecture series included speakers from the Tyndall National Institute, Cork and Sustainable Energy Ireland. These can be viewed on YouTube.

=== 2010 ===
Science Week 2010 ran from 7–14 November. Its theme was ‘Our Place in Space’, which explored the latest happenings in astronomy, Ireland’s role in the space industry, and the vital role played by science, technology, engineering and mathematics (STEM) in helping us to make sense of our universe.

=== 2011 ===
Science Week 2011 ran from 13–20 November. The theme was 'The Chemistry of Life', demonstrating the importance of chemistry to our everyday lives – from the atoms that are the building blocks of nature to the chemistry that creates lasting bonds between people.

=== 2012 ===
Science Week 2012 ran from 11–18 November. The theme was ‘Everyday Experimenting’, highlighting how we are all involved in science every day, carrying out scientific processes and experimenting, even when not aware of it.

=== 2013 ===
Science Week 2013 ran from 10–17 November. The theme was ‘Exploring the XTRA-Ordinary’, which called on the public to go ‘behind the scenes’ of everyday life and explore the extraordinary processes taking place in front of our eyes.

=== 2014 ===
An estimated 250,000 people took part in science festivals, demonstrations, seminars and tours across the country during the 19th annual national Science Week, which took place from 9–16 November 2014. The theme was ‘Power of Science’. Over 800 events took place across Ireland, including science festivals in Sligo, Galway, Mayo, Dublin, Cork, Waterford and the Midlands, aiming to "entertain, educate and enthral young and old alike with the power of science". Jamie Heaslip acted as a Science Week ambassador.

=== 2015 ===
2015 marked the 20th anniversary of Science Week, which took place from 8–15 November. The theme was ‘Science Week 2.0 Design Your Future’. It celebrated how science empowers ‘you’ to ‘Design Your Future’. Numerous events were held in every county, and regional festivals took place in Mayo, Sligo, Galway, Waterford, Cork, Limerick and the midlands.

=== 2016 ===
Science Week 2016 took place from 13–20 November. The theme was ‘Science Rising’ which looks at how science is key to our success – it is part of our past, an important part of our present and there is endless potential still to be realised. Science Week 2016 reached more people, all over Ireland, across a wider demographic than had been achieved before. Science Week 2016 saw 10 Regional Festivals across the country.

=== 2017 ===
Science Week 2017 ran nationwide from 12–19 November 2017. The theme was ‘Believe in Science’. More than 1180 events took place across Ireland. 12 regional science festivals took place in Cavan/Monaghan, Cork, Carlow, Festival of Farming and Food (Teagasc), Galway, Kerry, Limerick, Mayo, the Midlands, Sligo, Southeast and Tipperary.

A number of Science Foundation Ireland-funded Science Week events took place throughout the week, including events by the Ark Theatre, The British Council of Ireland, Dublinia, Dunsink Observatory, Foodoppi, Learnit Educational Solutions, the Science Gallery, ADAPT, The Rediscovery Centre and Wexford Co. Council. The Scintillating Science event with Dara O'Briain launched the beginning of Science Week in the National Concert Hall, and the Dublin Science Week Family Open Day at the Convention Centre Dublin was held at the end of the week.

During Science Week 2017, SFI launched the #StopAndAsk social media campaign which calls on people to ask questions about the world around them. Science Foundation Ireland, its partners and the science community answered a selection of these questions throughout the week.

=== 2018 ===
Science Week 2018 ran nationwide from 11–18 November 2018. The theme was a continuation of 2017 #BelieveInScience while also continuing the #StopAndAsk social media campaign.

In 2018 SFI funded 12 regional festivals in Cavan/Monaghan, Cork, Carlow, Festival of Farming and Food (Teagasc), Galway, Wexford, Limerick, Mayo, the Midlands, Sligo, Southeast and Tipperary and 15 funded events. The events varied between school visits, workshops and evening events and took place in venues across the country.

A show reel of some highlights of Science Week 2018 can be viewed on YouTube.

=== 2019 ===
Science Week 2019 will run from 10–16 November 2019.

== How to get involved ==
The SFI website outlines tips on how to get involved with Science Week in Ireland.

== See also ==
- Science Week
