= Health Insurance Authority =

Irish regulatory authority

The Health Insurance Authority (Irish: An tÚdarás Árachas Sláinte) is the regulatory body for private health insurance in Ireland. The Authority's remit is to monitor and research health insurance generally; operate the risk equalisation scheme; advise the Minister on health insurance generally; to increase public awareness of their rights as consumers of health insurance and the services available to them; monitor the operation of other relevant regulations as prescribed and safeguard the interests of current and future health insurance consumers.

The Authority was established on 1 February 2001 in accordance with the terms of the Health Insurance Act, 1994 by Micheál Martin TD, then the Minister for Health and Children. The Members were appointed following consultation with relevant industry, professional and consumer rights representatives. It is meant to be independent in the exercise of its functions and it is required to make a report of its activities to the Minister who will lay the report before each house of the Oireachtas.

It is composed of a chairperson and six members.

The current Chief Executive and Registrar is Brian Lee - who was appointed in 2024.
