= Discover Primary Science =

Discover Primary Science is a flagship project of the Irish Government’s Discover Science & Engineering (DSE) awareness programme.

It facilitates teacher training in general primary science and provides teachers with online resources and classroom activity packs which can also be used by parents and students.

In 2008, just over 3,100 primary schools and their teachers participated in activities which included hands-on induction days which were hosted throughout the country in colleges of education, institute of technology, universities and education centres.

== Awards of Science Excellence ==
Discover Primary Science also manages the Awards of Science Excellence each year, as well as coordinating a series of Discover Science Centres across the country.

Schools registered on the Discover Primary Science project can opt to apply for an Award of Science Excellence after they have met certain criteria for science-related activities. In 2007 and 2008, more than 1,000 schools received awards nationwide.
