= IDA Ireland =

Semi-State body concerned with foreign direct investment into Ireland

- An Ghníomhaireacht Forbartha Tionscail

State agency of the Department of Enterprise, Tourism and Employment overview
- Formed: 1949; 77 years ago
- Jurisdiction: Ireland
- Headquarters: Three Park Place, Hatch Street, Dublin; 53.33360°N 6.26058°W
- Minister responsible: Peter Burke, Minister for Enterprise, Tourism and Employment
- State agency of the Department of Enterprise, Tourism and Employment executives: Michael Lohan, CEO; Feargal O'Rourke, Chairman
- Parent department: Department of Enterprise, Tourism and Employment
- Website: www.idaireland.com

IDA Ireland (Irish: An Ghníomhaireacht Forbartha Tionscail) is the agency responsible for the attraction and retention of inward foreign direct investment (FDI) into Ireland. The agency was founded in 1949 as the Industrial Development Authority and placed on a statutory footing a year later. In 1969 it became a non-commercial autonomous state-sponsored body. Today it is a semi-state body that plays an important role in Ireland's relationship with foreign investors, with multinationals accounting for 10.2% of employment and 66% of Irish exports. The agency partners with investors to help them to begin or expand their operations in the Irish market. It provides funding support to research and development projects, and has a number of direct support mechanisms, including employment and training grants.

== History ==
In the years following World War II, Ireland began moving towards a more open economic model, away from the old model characterised by import substitution industrialisation. As part of this wider push, the Minister for Industry and Commerce at the time, Daniel Morrissey, proposed the creation of a body to advise the government on industrial policy. The Industrial Development Authority was created to fill this role in 1949.

Throughout the 1950s, the IDA established its vision of 'industrialisation by invitation,' one which initiated the low corporation-tax system that remains in place in Ireland today. According to an article in a U.S. law journal in 1984, the IDA is 'probably the most powerful governmental agency in Ireland,' as it 'acts as both coordinator and lobbyist for all matters relating to manufacturing and service industries as well as the industrial infrastructure.' IDA Ireland has a large global network of branches/offices in the U.S., Europe, and Asia.

== Governance and funding ==
While IDA Ireland gets its funding from the Irish State (with costs circa €48m in 2017), as an autonomous non-commercial state-sponsored body, it maintains its own independent board and governance. IDA Ireland is authorised to issue grants and financial incentives to firms coming to Ireland (paying out €91 million in 2017).

== Successes ==
The IDA has been successful in attracting multinationals to Ireland over decades. As of 2018, foreign multinationals pay 80% of all Irish corporate taxes, directly employing 25% of the Irish labour-force, and are responsible for 57% of the non-farm economic value-add in Ireland (40% of value-add in Irish services and 80% of value-add in Irish manufacturing). They comprise 14 of Ireland's top 20 firms (including tax inversions). Key "selling points" have been the young, English-speaking, flexible workforce, a strong educational system, commercially-aware third level institutions, a location which allows easy exporting into Europe, and the ability to tap into European talent in the wake of Brexit, and a 'clustering effect' in certain industrial and business sectors.

== Criticisms ==
=== Narrow base ===
The IDA is strongly reliant on the U.S. as a source of FDI. There are no non-U.S./non-U.K. firms in Ireland's top 50 firms (by revenue), and only one by employees, the German retailer Lidl. The 14 foreign multinationals in Ireland's top 20 firms are all U.S-based (including tax inversions). The U.K. firms in Ireland, outside of retailers like Tesco who sell into Ireland (also like Lidl), are pre-2009 after which the U.K. changed its tax code (see U.K. transformation).

=== Taxation ===
Up until 2018, the U.S. was one of the last few global jurisdictions not to run a "territorial" tax system (the U.K. switched in 2009–12). Jurisdictions with "territorial" tax systems have separate, and much lower, tax rates for foreign-sourced profits, and companies from such places therefore make less use of Ireland as a base. While the IDA market Ireland as a base from which to sell into Europe, Despite other features, some commentators see Ireland as a base for U.S. multinationals to shield themselves from the pre-TCJA “worldwide” tax system (Ireland is sometimes described as a corporate haven).

U.S. multinationals aside, Ireland's main attractiveness is for life sciences manufacturing, who have an optimal combination of intellectual property and tangible assets to use Ireland's main IP-based BEPS tool, the capital allowances for intangible assets scheme (which has an Irish effective tax rate of <3%). A key IDA Ireland target market is Japan, which is a large global source of life sciences manufacturing enterprises, and also has one of the highest corporate tax rates in the world.

=== Brexit ===
The IDA has listed managing Brexit as a priority in the coming years. Ireland has been criticised for failing to win substantive London business, and particularly the valuable financial services business, as a result of Brexit. However, the IDA has been credited with achieving limited success in the face of housing and infrastructure shortages and regulatory hurdles, and a 2018 S&P Global Market Intelligence study found that Germany and Ireland were the leaders in attracting financial businesses relocating from London. In the Irish government's 2019 budget, IDA Ireland was allocated €2 million for the purposes of Brexit preparedness and increasing Ireland's "global footprint".

== Challenges ==
The majority of foreign multinationals in Ireland are also concentrated in a small group of very large technology and life science firms. These firms have the "intellectual property" (or IP) needed to use Ireland's IP-based BEPS tax tools (which have effective Irish corporate tax rates of <3%). Ireland's largest company Apple, post their giant BEPS inversion in 2015 (see "leprechaun economics"), now represents circa 25% of Irish GDP. Because of Apple, the Central Bank of Ireland has had to replace Irish GDP with modified gross national income (or GNI*).

As well as the beneficial use of Ireland's IP-based BEPS tax tools, and a relatively low corporation tax, there remain a range of other reasons for IDA Ireland's successes, including the English-speaking location to tap into European talent in the wake of Brexit, the highly skilled workforce, and 'clustering effect'.

With the overhaul of the U.S. tax code under the Tax Cuts and Jobs Act of 2017, and a switch to a "territorial" system, it has been shown the net effective tax rates in the U.S. and Ireland are now almost identical, even with the replacement single malt system still in place (see effect of TCJA on Ireland). There is a concern whether Ireland will suffer in such an environment, both in terms of keeping existing U.S. multinationals and attracting more. This is amplified by Ireland's mid-range competitiveness in most non-taxation related aspects; the country is usually positively cited for ease of doing business, but other aspects are seen as less successful (see, for example, the Global Competitiveness Report, where Ireland typically places in the 20th-25th world ranking range).

== Plans ==
In 2015 the Irish government announced a five-year plan for the IDA aimed at accelerating economic recovery in the country, setting a target of 80,000 jobs by 2019 and investing €150 million in a regional property programme. This jobs target was reached in 2017. In its 2019 budget the Irish government allocated an additional €10 million to the property programme to promote regional development.

== See also ==
- State Agencies of the Republic of Ireland
- Enterprise Ireland
- Forfas
- IBEC
- Shannon Development
- Corporate haven
- Global Competitiveness Report
- Ireland as a tax haven
- The Lonely Battle of Thomas Reid
