= Cyber Ireland =

Irish Cyber Security Cluster

Cyber Ireland is a business cluster organisation that connects businesses, educational institutions and the state to support the growing cyber security industry in Ireland, which consisted of over 60 domestic and 40 multinational cyber-security companies in 2018. Launched in 2019 by the IDA and Enterprise Ireland's Regional Technology Cluster Fund, Cyber Ireland had over 180 members as of the start of 2022 including Johnson Controls International, Dell EMC, IBM, McAfee, McKesson and Trend Micro. Cyber Ireland was the first business cluster to be formed in the country.

== Purpose and structure ==
Cyber security is a key sector in Ireland with five of the world's leading software security companies located there, however there is an acknowledged skills gap in the industry with around 48% of Irish companies having open or unfilled cyber security positions. Facilitated by the Cork Institute of Technology, Cyber Ireland works with academia to ensure there is a consistent supply of trained cyber security talent to feed the industry. Three regional working groups exist for South, North West and Western areas, as well as two Special Interest Groups, Threat Intelligence and Operational Security. As well as addressing the skills shortage, Cyber Ireland provides a collective voice for the sector companies

== The 2021 HSE Conti Ransomware Attack ==
A malware attack on the IT systems of the Irish Health Service Executive shut down all IT systems across all hospitals in Ireland causing major and long-lasting disruption to the health service. This was the largest cyber attack in Ireland and the largest against any healthcare system worldwide. As a result, IT security became a focus for businesses outside the cyber security industry, placing additional pressure on the supply of skills. In response, Cyber Ireland together with third-level education providers including IT Sligo increased the cyber security content of existing courses.

== Top cybersecurity providers in Ireland ==
With the rise in digital transformation and the rapid adoption of technology, the importance of cybersecurity has never been more critical. In Ireland, businesses, government agencies, and individuals are increasingly aware of the need to secure their digital assets from ever-evolving cyber threats. As a result, there has been a surge in demand for cybersecurity providers in Ireland that can offer robust protection against data breaches, ransomware attacks, and other cyber risks.
