= IFAC =

IFAC may refer to:

- International Fine Arts College, now renamed to the Miami International University of Art & Design.
- International Fine Arts Consortium, the independent curatorial platform in New York.
- International Federation of Accountants, founded in 1977.
- International Federation of Automatic Control
- Irish Fiscal Advisory Council, Irish statutory body overseeing compliance with EU rules.

Regulatory body
