= Double Irish arrangement =

Irish corporate tax avoidance tool

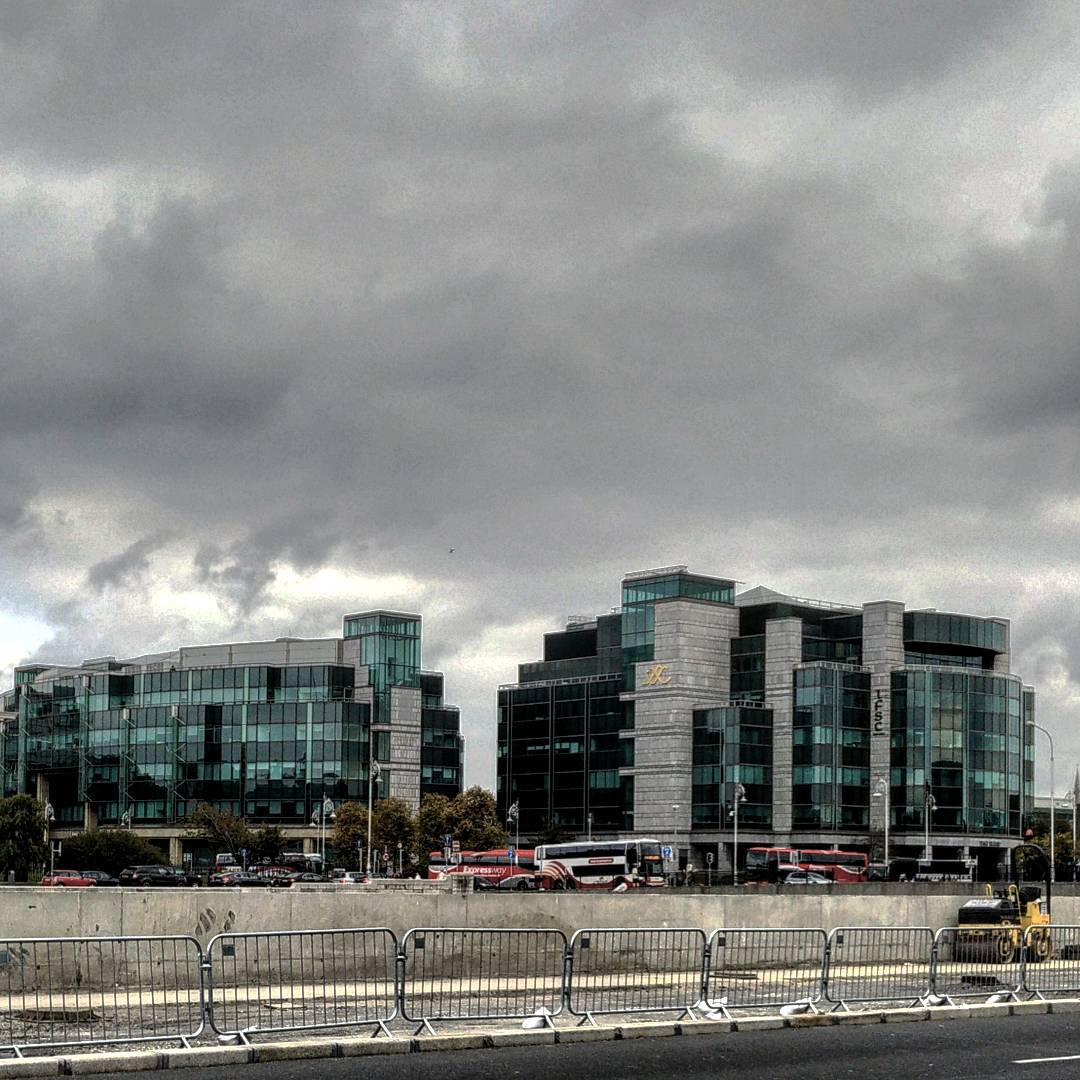
International Financial Services Centre (IFSC), centre of US multinational tax planning in Ireland

The Double Irish arrangement was a base erosion and profit shifting (BEPS) corporate tax avoidance tool used mainly by United States multinationals between the late 1980s and late 2010s to avoid corporate taxation on non-US profits. (Note: The Double Irish is sometimes misunderstood as being only used for EU–sourced revenues and business. For example, in 2016, Facebook recorded global revenues of $27 billion, while Facebook in Ireland paid €30 million in Irish tax on Irish revenues of €13 billion (approximately half of all global revenues). Similarly, when the EU introduced the GDPR regulations in 2018, Facebook disclosed that all of its non-US accounts (circa 1.9 billion, of which 1.5 billion were non-E.U), were legally based in Dublin. Similarly, Google is also believed to run most of its non-US sales revenue and profits through its Dublin operation.) (The US was one of a small number of countries that did not use a "territorial" tax system, and taxed corporations on all profits, no matter whether the profit was made outside the US or not, in contrast to "territorial" tax systems which tax only profits made within that country.) (Note: Before the passing of the Tax Cuts and Jobs Act] in December 2017, the US was one of eight remaining jurisdictions to run a "worldwide" taxation system, which was the principal obstacle to US corporate tax reform, as it was not possible to differentiate between the source of income. The seven other "worldwide" tax systems, are: Chile, Greece, Ireland, Israel, Korea, Mexico, and Poland. The positive experience of the UK switch to a "territorial" system in 2009–12, and the Japanese switch to a "territorial" system in 2009, amongst others, was continually highlighted by US tax academics.) It was the largest tax avoidance tool in history. By 2010, it was shielding US$100 billion annually in US multinational foreign profits from taxation, (Note: Before the US 2017 TCJA repatriation tax, the Double Irish shielded all non-US profits of US multinationals from: (a) taxation in the end-consumer market, (b) from taxation in Ireland, and (c) from US taxation. The 2017 TCJA placed a 15.5% US tax on these untaxed profits, and they were deemed to be automatically repatriated (regardless of whether the US multinational wanted to repatriate the untaxed profits or not).) and was the main tool by which US multinationals built up untaxed offshore reserves of US$1 trillion from 2004 to 2018. (Note: 2004 was the date of the last Bush Administration tax amnesty, when pre–2004 offshore untaxed cash was repatriated at a special US tax rate of 5%; in 2018, the TCJA repatriation tax rate was 15.5%.) (Note: While various sources quote the amount of untaxed cash reserves as being closer to USD 2 trillion, a component of this figure represents cash flow that is awaiting reinvestment in the overseas markets, non-cash assets, and US banking flows; the strong consensus is that the pure cash figure is at least over USD 1 trillion.) Traditionally, it was also used with the Dutch Sandwich BEPS tool; however, 2010 changes to tax laws in Ireland dispensed with this requirement.

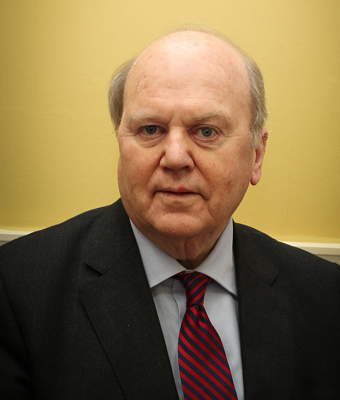
Former Finance Minister Michael Noonan closed the Double Irish BEPS tool to new entrants in October 2014 (existing schemes to close by 2020), but expanded the CAIA BEPS tool as a replacement in 2011–2016, and infamously told an Irish MEP who alerted him to the Single Malt BEPS tool, to "put on the green jersey".

Despite US knowledge of the Double Irish for a decade, it was the European Commission that in October 2014 forced Ireland to close the scheme, starting in January 2015. However, users of existing schemes, such as Apple, Google, Facebook and Pfizer, were given until January 2020 to close them. At the announcement of the closure, it was known that multinationals had replacement BEPS tools in Ireland, the Single Malt (2014), and Capital Allowances for Intangible Assets (CAIA) (2009):

1. Single malt is almost identical to the Double Irish, and was identified with Microsoft (LinkedIn), and Allergan in 2017;
2. CAIA can provide up to twice the tax shield of Single Malt, or Double Irish, and was identified with Apple in the 2015 leprechaun economics affair.

In their 1994 paper, the economist James R. Hines Jr. and his PhD student Eric M. Rice showed in that US multinational use of tax havens and BEPS tools had maximised long-term US Treasury receipts. They showed that multinationals from "territorial" tax systems, which all but a handful of countries follow, did not use BEPS tools, or tax havens, including those that had recently switched, such as Japan (2009), and the UK (2009–12). By 2018, tax academics showed US multinationals were the largest users of BEPS tools and Ireland was the largest global BEPS hub or tax haven. They showed that US multinationals represented the largest component of the Irish economy and that Ireland had failed to attract multinationals from "territorial" tax systems. (Note: It is believed that Ireland's extreme economic exposure to US corporate BEPS activity had led Ireland to expand into more traditional tax haven–type tools, such as the Qualifying investor alternative investment fund (QIAIF) (designed to compete with the Cayman Islands SPC), and the Irish Section 110 Special Purpose Vehicle (SPV) (designed to compete with the Luxembourg SPV).)

The United States switched to a "territorial" tax system in the December 2017 Tax Cuts and Jobs Act (TCJA), causing American tax academics to forecast the demise of Irish BEPS tools and Ireland as an American corporate tax haven. However, by mid-2018, other tax academics, including the IMF, noted that technical flaws in the TCJA had increased the attractiveness of Ireland's BEPS tools, and the CAIA BEPS tool in particular, which post-TCJA, delivered a total effective tax rate (ETR) of 0–2.5% on profits that can be fully repatriated to the US without incurring any additional US taxation. In July 2018, one of Ireland's leading tax economists forecasted a "boom" in the use of the Irish CAIA BEPS tool as US multinationals close existing Double Irish BEPS schemes before the 2020 deadline.

== Double Irish ==
=== Concept and origin (1991) ===
The Double Irish is an intellectual property–based BEPS tool. Under OECD rules, corporations with intellectual property (IP), which are mostly technology and life sciences firms, can turn this into an intangible asset (IA) on their balance sheet, and charge it out as a tax-deductible royalty payment to end-customers. Without such IP, if Microsoft charged a German end-customer $100, for Microsoft Office, a profit of about $95 (as the cost to Microsoft for copies of Microsoft Office is small) would be realised in Germany, and German tax would be payable on this profit. However, if Germany allows such an intangible asset, Microsoft can additionally charge Microsoft Germany $95 in IP royalty payments on each copy of Microsoft Office, reducing its German profits to zero. The $95 is paid to the entity in which the IP is legally housed. Microsoft would prefer to house this IP in a tax haven; however, higher-tax locations like Germany do not sign full tax treaties with tax havens, and would not accept the IP charged from a tax haven as deductible against German taxation. The Double Irish fixes this problem.

The Double Irish enables the IP to be charged-out from Ireland, which has a large global network of full bilateral tax treaties. (Note: In September 2018, Ireland had a global network of 73 bilateral tax treaties, and a 74th with Ghana awaiting ratification.) The Double Irish enables the hypothetical $95, which was sent from Germany to Ireland, to be sent on to a tax haven such as Bermuda without incurring any Irish taxation. The techniques of using IP to relocate profits from higher-tax locations to low-tax locations are called base erosion and profit shifting (BEPS) tools. There are many types of BEPS tools (e.g. debt–based BEPS tools); however, IP-based BEPS tool are the largest group.

As with all Irish BEPS tools, the Irish subsidiary must conduct a "relevant trade" on the IP in Ireland. (Note: Under Section 291A of the 1997 Irish Tax and Consolidated Acts, users of Irish BEPS tools must conduct a "relevant trade" and perform "relevant activities" in Ireland to give the BEPS tool a degree of credibility and substance. In effect, it can equate to an "employment tax" on the Irish subsidiary, however, to the extent that the "relevant activities" are needed within the Group (e.g. they are performing real tasks), then the effect of this "employment tax" is mitigated. While the Irish State has never published the employment metrics for using Irish BEPS tools, the evidence is that even where the "relevant activities" were completely unnecessary, the "employment tax" equates to circa 2–3% of profits shifted through Ireland (see here).) A "business plan" must be produced with Irish employment and salary levels that are acceptable to the Irish State during the period the BEPS tool is in operation. (Note: In documents released under FOI from the Irish Department of Finance Tax Strategy Group, they describe the CAIA BEPS tool as a: "measure was introduced to support the development of the knowledge economy and the provision of high-quality employment.) Despite these requirements, the effective tax rate (ETR) of the Double Irish is almost 0%, as the EU Commission discovered with Apple in 2016.

Most major US technology and life sciences multinationals have been identified as using the Double Irish. By 2010, US$95 billion of US profits were shifted annually to Ireland, which increased to US$106 billion by 2015. As the BEPS tool with which US multinationals built up untaxed offshore reserves of circa US$1 trillion from 2004 to 2017, the Double Irish is the largest tax avoidance tool in history. In 2016, when the EU levied a €13 billion fine on Apple, the largest tax fine in history, it only covered the period 2004–14, during which Apple shielded €111 billion in profits from U.S. (and Irish) tax.

The earliest recorded versions of the Double Irish-type BEPS tools are by Apple in the late 1980s, and the EU discovered Irish Revenue tax rulings on the Double Irish for Apple in 1991. Irish state documents released to the Irish national archives in December 2018 showed that Fine Gael ministers in 1984 sought legal advice on how US corporations could avoid taxes by operating from Ireland. The former Irish Taoiseach, John Bruton, wrote to the then Finance Minister Alan Dukes saying: "In order to retain the maximum tax advantage, US corporations will wish to locate FSCs in a country where they will have to pay little or no tax. Therefore unless FSCs are given favourable tax treatment in Ireland, they will not locate here." Feargal O'Rourke, PwC tax partner in the IFSC (and son of Minister Mary O'Rourke, cousin of the 2008–2011 Irish Finance Minister Brian Lenihan Jnr) is regarded as its "grand architect".

=== Basic structure (no Dutch sandwich) ===
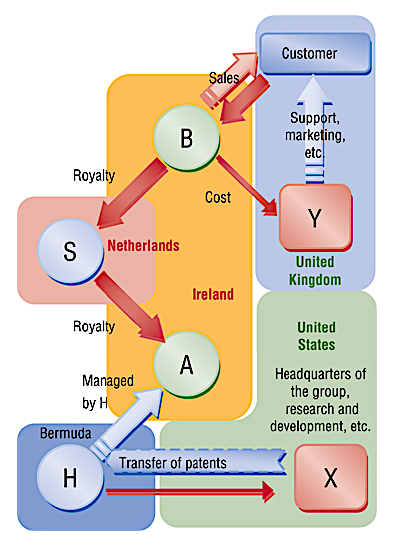
Chart 1: Reproduction of the classic IMF diagram of the full "Double Irish with a Dutch Sandwich" BEPS tool: From the corporation: 1. CORP (X) creates the software.; 2. CORP (X) sells IP to BER1 (H).; 3. BER1 (H) revalues IP higher.; 4. BER1 (H) licenses IP to IRL2 (A).; 5. IRL2 (A) licenses IP to DUT1 (S).; 6. DUT1 (S) licenses IP to IRL1 (B).; 7. IRL1 (B) sells software to customer.; From the customer: 1. Customer pays $100 to IRL1 (B).; 2. IRL1 (B) pays $100 to DUT1 (S) as royalty.; 3. DUT1 (S) pays $100 to IRL2 (A) as royalty.; 4. IRL2 (A) pays $100 to BER1 (H) as royalty.; 5. BER1 (H) accumulates the cash.; 6. BER1 (H) can lend cash to CORP (X).

While there have been variations (e.g. Apple), the standard Double Irish arrangement, in simplified form, takes the following structure (note that the steps below initially exclude the Dutch sandwich component for simplicity, which is explained in the next section; Chart 1 includes the Dutch sandwich): (Note: The most cited academic explanation of the Double Irish Dutch Sandwich, is Edward Kleinbard's 2011 Stateless Income, however it is not possible to reference a copy online.)

1. A US corporate (CORP, or X) develops new software in the US costing $1 to build;
2. CORP sells it to its wholly owned Bermuda company (BER1, or H) for $1 (at cost, ideally);
3. BER1 revalues it to $100 (as an intangible asset under GAAP), and books gain in Bermuda (tax free);
4. BER1 licenses it to its wholly owned Irish subsidiary (IRL1, or B) for $100;
5. IRL1 then sells it in Germany to a customer for $100;
6. IRL1 uses the $100 from Germany to pay the $100 royalty to BER1 (no profit in Ireland);
7. BER1 holds the $100 cash in perpetuity, thus avoiding US 35% tax;
8. BER1 lends the $100 cash back to CORP (and other subsidiaries).

This structure has a problem. The pre–TCJA US tax code allows foreign income to be left in foreign subsidiaries (deferring US taxes), but it will consider BER1 to be a controlled foreign corporation (or "CFC"), sheltering income from a related party transaction (i.e. IRL1). It will apply full US taxes to BER1 at 35%.

To get around this, the US corporation needs to create a second Irish company (IRL2, or A), legally incorporated in Ireland (so under the US tax code it is Irish), but which is "managed and controlled" from Bermuda (so under the Irish tax code it is from Bermuda). IRL2 will be placed between BER1 and IRL1 (i.e. owned by BER1, and owning IRL1). Up until the 2015 shut-down of the Double Irish, the Irish tax code was one of the few that allowed a company to be legally incorporated in its jurisdiction, but not be subject to its taxes (if managed and controlled elsewhere).

The US corporation will "check-the-box" for IRL1, declaring it a foreign subsidiary selling to non-US locations. Then the US tax code will ignore IRL1 from US tax calculations. However, because the US tax code also views IRL2 as foreign (i.e. Irish), it also ignores the transactions between IRL1 and IRL2 (even though they are related parties). This is the essence of the Double Irish arrangement.

Note that in some explanations and diagrams BER1 is omitted (the Bermuda black hole); however, it is rare for a US corporation to "own" IRL2 directly.

=== Elimination of Dutch Sandwich (2010) ===
The Irish tax code historically levied a 20% withholding tax on transfers from an Irish company like IRL1, to companies in tax havens like BER1. However, if IRL1 sends the money to a new Dutch company DUT1 (or S), via another royalty payment scheme, no Irish withholding tax is payable as Ireland does not levy withholding tax on transfers within EU states. In addition, under the Dutch tax code DUT1 can send money to IRL2 (an Irish company that is legally incorporated in Ireland, and thus the US-tax code regards it as foreign, but is "managed and controlled" from, say, Bermuda and thus the Irish tax code also regards it as foreign) under another royalty scheme without incurring Dutch withholding tax, as the Dutch do not charge withholding tax on royalty payment schemes. This is called the Dutch Sandwich and DUT1 is described as the "Dutch slice" (sitting between IRL1 and IRL2). Thus, with the addition of IRL2 and DUT1, we have the "Double Irish Dutch Sandwich" tax structure.

In 2010, the Irish government, on lobbying from PwC Ireland's IFSC tax partner, Feargal O'Rourke, relaxed the rules for sending royalty payments to non-EU countries without incurring Irish withholding tax (thus ending the Dutch Sandwich), but they are subject to conditions that will not suit all Double Irish arrangements.

O'Rourke set out to simplify those structures, eliminating the need for a Dutch intermediary. In October 2007, he met at Google's Dublin headquarters on Barrow Street with Tadhg O'Connell, the head of the Revenue division that audits tech companies. O'Connell is understood to have rejected O'Rourke's request that royalties like Google's should be able to flow directly to units in Bermuda and Cayman without being taxed. In 2008, O'Rourke's cousin Brian Lenihan became finance minister, setting much of the Revenue's policy. Two years later, after continued entreaties by O'Rourke, the Revenue's office announced that it would no longer impose withholding taxes on such transactions.

— Jesse Drucker, Bloomberg, "Man Making Ireland Tax Avoidance Hub Proves Local Hero", 28 October 2013

=== Controversial closure (2015) ===
The 2014–16 EU investigation into Apple in Ireland (see below), showed that the Double Irish existed as far back as 1991. Early US academic research in 1994 into US multinational use of tax havens identified profit shifting accounting techniques. US congressional investigations into the tax practices of US multinationals were aware of such BEPS tools for many years. However, the US did not try to force the closure of the Double Irish BEPS tool, instead it was the EU which forced Ireland to close the Double Irish to new schemes in October 2014. Nevertheless, existing users of the Double Irish BEPS tool (e.g. Apple, Google, Facebook, Microsoft, amongst many others), were given five more years until January 2020, before the tool would be fully shut-down to all users.

This approach by successive US administrations is explained by an early insight that one of the most cited US academic researchers into tax havens, and corporate taxation, James R. Hines Jr., had in 1994. Hines realised in 1994, that: "low foreign tax rates [from tax havens] ultimately enhance U.S. tax collections". Hines would revisit this concept several times, as would others, and it would guide US policy in this area for decades, including introducing the "check-the-box" (Note: Before 1996, the United States, like other high-income countries, had anti-avoidance rules—known as "controlled foreign corporations" provisions—designed to immediately tax in the United States some foreign income (such as royalties and interest) conducive of profit shifting. In 1996, the IRS issued regulations that enabled US multinationals to avoid some of these rules by electing to treat their foreign subsidiaries as if they were not corporations but disregarded entities for tax purposes. This move is called "checking the box" because that is all that needs to be done on IRS form 8832 to make it work and use Irish BEPS tools on non-US revenues was a compromise to keep US multinationals from leaving the US (page 10.)) rules in 1996, curtailing the 2000–10 OECD initiative on tax havens, and not signing the 2016 OECD anti-BEPS initiative.

Lower foreign tax rates entail smaller credits for foreign taxes and greater ultimate U.S. tax collections (Hines and Rice, 1994). Dyreng and Lindsey (2009), offer evidence that U.S. firms with foreign affiliates in certain tax havens pay lower foreign taxes and higher U.S. taxes than do otherwise-similar large U.S. companies.

— James R. Hines Jr., "Treasure Islands" p. 107 (2010)

By September 2018, tax academics proved US multinationals were the largest users of BEPS tools, and that Ireland was the largest global BEPS hub.

In December 2018, Seamus Coffey, the Chairman of the Irish Fiscal Advisory Council, told The Times in relation to the closure of the Double Irish that "A lot of emphasis has been put on residency rules and I think that emphasis has been misplaced and the changes didn't have that much [of an] effect". On 3 January 2019, The Guardian reported that Google avoided corporate taxes on US$23 billion of profits in 2017 by using the Double Irish with the Dutch sandwich extension.

=== Apple's €13 billion EU fine (2016) ===
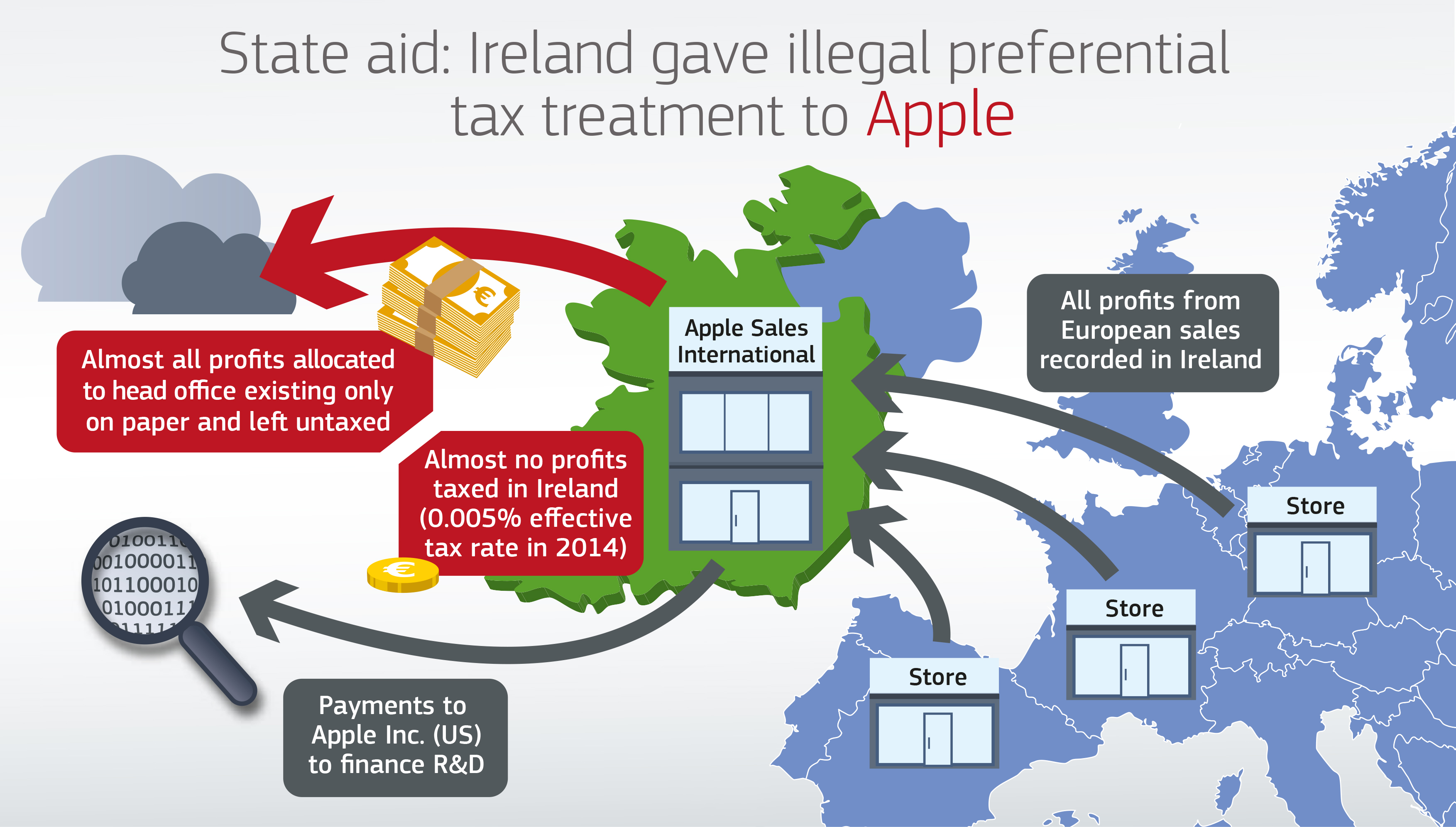
The EU Commission's diagram of Apple's "Double Irish" BEPS tool

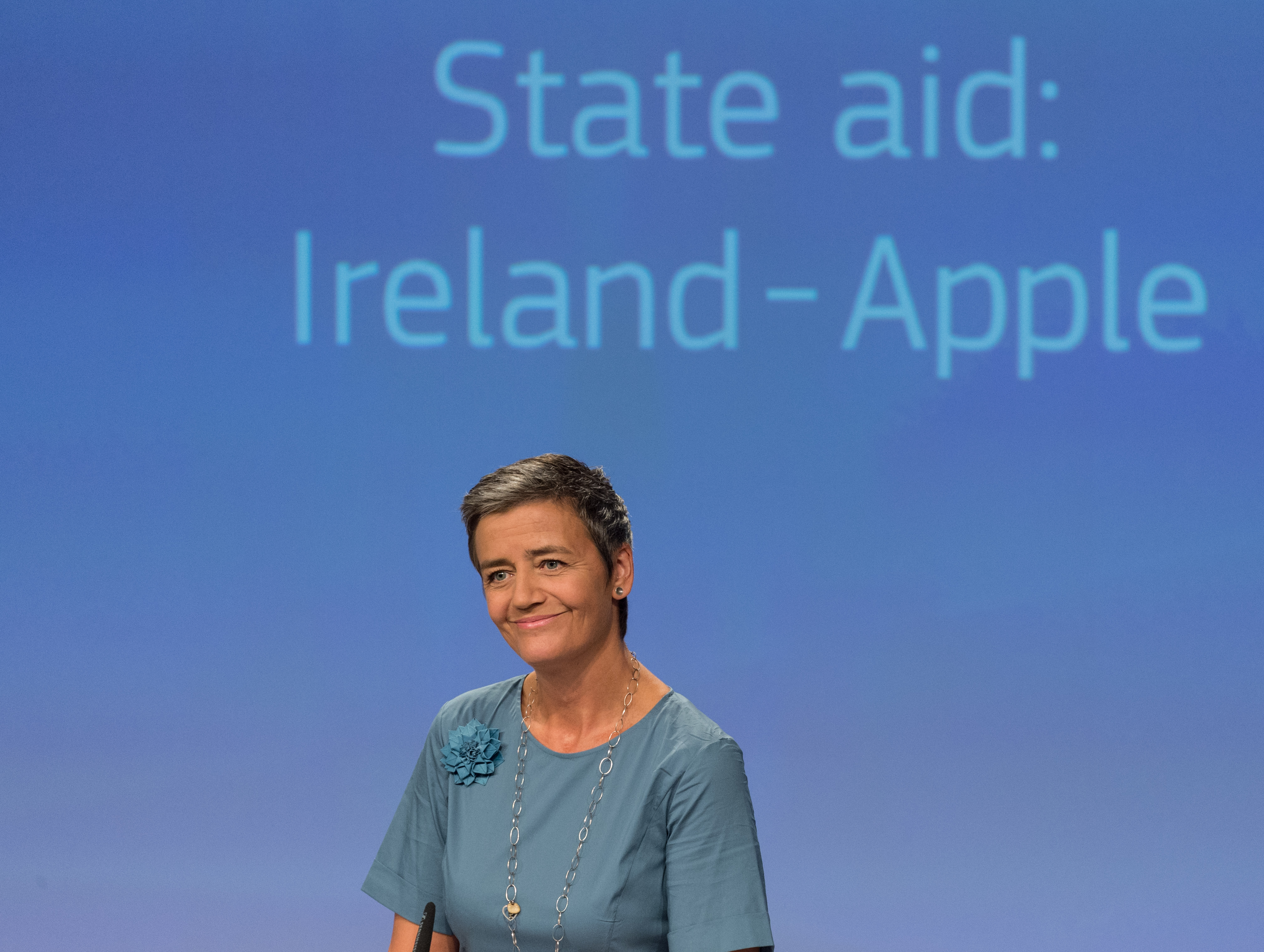
Margrethe Vestager, announcing Apple's €13 billion fine for Irish taxes avoided from 2004 to 2014 via an illegal "Double Irish" BEPS scheme

By 2017, Apple was Ireland's largest company, and post leprechaun economics, accounted for over one quarter of Irish GDP growth. Apple's use of the Double Irish BEPS tool to achieve tax rates <1%, dates back to the late 1980s, and was investigated by the US Senate in May 2013, and covered in the main financial media.

On 29 August 2016 the European Commissioner for Competition concluded Apple had received illegal State aid from Ireland. The commission ordered Apple to pay €13 billion, plus interest, in unpaid Irish taxes on circa €111 billion of profits, for the ten-year period, 2004–2014. It was the largest corporate tax fine in history.

Apple was not using the standard Double Irish arrangement of two Irish companies (IRL1 in Ireland, and IRL2 in Bermuda). Instead, Apple combined the functions of the two companies inside one Irish company (namely, Apple Sales International, or ASI), which was split into two internal "branches". The Irish Revenue issued private rulings to Apple in 1991 and 2007 regarding this hybrid-double Irish structure, which the EU Commission considered as illegal State aid.

This selective treatment allowed Apple to pay an effective corporate tax rate of 1 per cent on its European profits in 2003 down to 0.005 per cent in 2014.

— Margrethe Vestager, "State aid (SA.38373): Ireland gave illegal tax benefits to Apple worth up to €13 billion", 30 August 2016.

== Single Malt ==
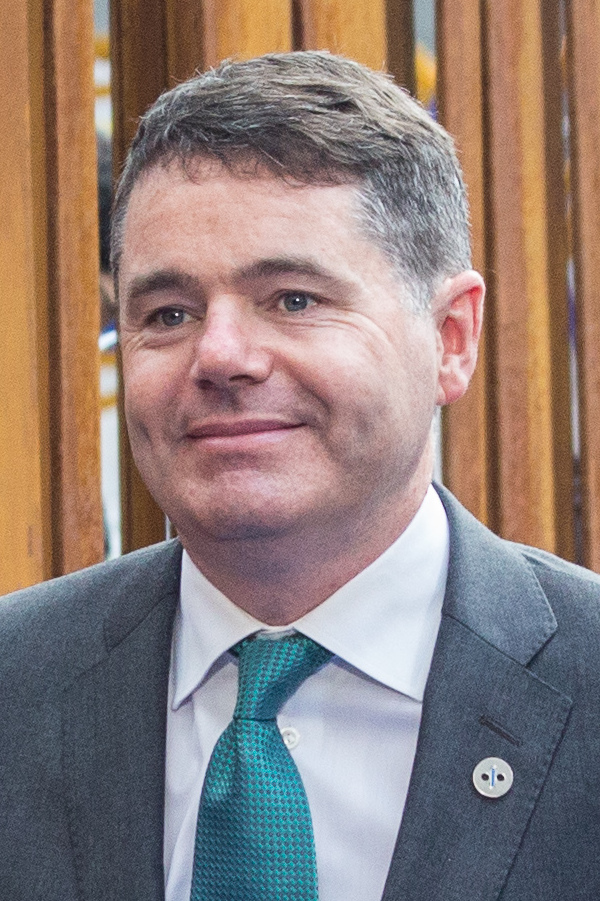
Irish Finance Minister Paschal Donohoe reversed some of the benefits ex-Finance Minister Michael Noonan gave the CAIA BEPS tool for Apple in 2015, and promised to investigate the Single Malt BEPS tool.

=== Concept and origin (2014) ===
In an October 2013 interview, PwC tax partner Feargal O'Rourke (see above), said that: "the days of the Double Irish tax scheme are numbered".

In October 2014, as the EU forced the Irish State to close the Double Irish BEPS tool, the influential US National Tax Journal published an article by Jeffrey L Rubinger and Summer Lepree, showing that Irish based subsidiaries of US corporations could replace the Double Irish arrangement with a new structure (now known as Single Malt). If the Bermuda–controlled Irish company (IRL2) was relocated to a country with whom (a) Ireland had a tax treaty, (b) with wording on "management and control" tax residency, and (c) had a zero corporate tax rate, then the Double Irish effect could be replicated. They highlighted Malta as a candidate. The Irish media picked up the article, but when an Irish MEP notified the then Finance Minister, Michael Noonan, he was told to "put on the green jersey".

=== Basic structure ===
The Single Malt is also an IP–based BEPS tool, and as a small variation of the Double Irish, required little additional development, except choosing specific locations with the necessary specific wording in their Irish bilateral tax treaties (e.g. Malta and the UAE); thus the basic structure is almost identical to the Double Irish with often a Maltese company replacing BER1 in the earlier example.

=== Discovery (2017) ===
A November 2017 report by Christian Aid, titled Impossible Structures, showed how quickly the Single Malt BEPS tool was replacing the Double Irish. The report detailed Microsoft subsidiary LinkedIn, and Allergan's schemes and extracts from advisers to their clients. The report also showed that Ireland was behaving like a "Captured State", and for example had opted out of Article 12 of the 2016 OECD anti-BEPS initiative to protect the Single Malt BEPS tool (it was also later pointed out in September 2018, that Malta had similarly opted out of Article 4 of the initiative to enable it to be the recipient of the Single Malt). The then Irish Finance Minister Paschal Donohoe said that it would be investigated; however, questions were raised regarding the Irish State's policy of addressing corporate tax avoidance.

Figures released in April 2017 show that since 2015 there has been a dramatic increase in companies using Ireland as a low-tax or no-tax jurisdiction for intellectual property (IP) and the income accruing to it, via a nearly 1000% increase in the uptake of a tax break expanded between 2014 and 2017.

— Christian Aid. Impossible Structures, November 2017 (p. 3)

In September 2018, The Irish Times revealed that US medical device manufacturer Teleflex, had created a new Single Malt scheme in July 2018, and had reduced their overall effective corporate tax rate to circa 3%. The same article quoted a spokesman from the Department of Finance (Ireland) saying they had not as yet taken any action regarding the Single Malt BEPS tool, but they were keeping the matter, "under consideration".

=== Partial closure (2018) ===
In November 2018, the Irish Government amended the Ireland–Malta tax treaty to prevent the Single Malt BEPS tool being used between Ireland and Malta (it can still be used with the UAE for example); however, the exact closure date of the Irish Single Malt BEPS tool with Malta was deferred until September 2019.

On the same day that the closure was announced, The Irish Times reported that LinkedIn (Ireland), identified as a user of the Single Malt tool in 2017 (see above), had announced in filings that it had sold a major IP asset to its parent, Microsoft (Ireland). Earlier in July 2018, Ireland's Sunday Business Post, disclosed that Microsoft (Ireland) were preparing a restructure of their Irish BEPS tools into a CAIA (or Green Jersey) Irish tax structure.

=== Rediscovery (2021) ===
In September 2021, The Irish Times reported that US pharmaceutical firm Abbott Laboratories was still using the Single Malt tool to shield profits on its COVID-19 testing kits.

== Capital Allowances for Intangible Assets (CAIA) ==
=== Concept and origin (2009) ===
The Double Irish and Single Malt BEPS tools enable Ireland to act as a confidential "Conduit OFC" rerouting untaxed profits to places like Bermuda (e.g. it must be confidential as higher-tax locations would not sign full tax treaties with locations like Bermuda), the Capital Allowances for Intangible Assets (CAIA) BEPS tool (also called the Green Jersey), enables Ireland to act as the terminus for the untaxed profits (e.g. Ireland becomes Bermuda, a "Sink OFC"). The CAIA uses the accepted tax concept of providing capital allowances for the purchase of assets. (Note: Most tax codes in developed countries have capital allowance programs that give tax relief on capital expenditure that is amortised over the life of the capital asset on which the capital was invested in.) However, Ireland turns it into a BEPS tool by providing the allowances for the purchase of intangible assets, and especially intellectual property assets, and critically, where the owner of the intangible assets is a "connected party" (e.g. a Group subsidiary).

A hypothetical multinational with an equity market capitalisation of €1,000 million, but tangible assets of €100 million, can argue that the gap of €900 million represents its intangible asset base, which can be legally created and appropriately located. (Note: While not stating it explicitly, it is implied in the document, that the location is one where the rate of tax is zero, such as Bermuda or Jersey) .. Ireland's Capital Allowances for Intangible Assets program enables these intangible assets to be turned into tax deductible charges. .. With appropriate structuring, the intergroup acquisition financing for the purchase of these intangible assets, can also be used to further amplify the quantum of tax deductible charges.

— KPMG, "Intellectual Property Tax" (4 December 2017)

For example, in Q1 2015, Apple used the CAIA tool when its Irish subsidiary purchased US$300 billion in intangible assets from an Apple subsidiary based in Jersey. The CAIA tool enabled Apple to write-off the US$300 billion price as a capital allowance against future Irish profits (e.g. the next US$300 billion of profits Apple books in Ireland are free of Irish tax). The CAIA capitalises the effect of the Double Irish or Single Malt BEPS tools, and behaves like a corporate tax inversion of a US multinational's non-US business. However, the CAIA is more powerful, as Apple demonstrated by effectively doubling the tax shield (e.g. to US$600 billion in allowances), via Irish interest relief on the intergroup virtual loans used to purchase the IP. (Note: In simple terms, Apple gave its Irish subsidiary a USD 300 billion intergroup loan to buy the intangible assets from the Apple subsidiary in Jersey. Apple in Ireland can charge the interest on this intergroup loan against Irish tax, while the Apple subsidiary in Jersey, who is receiving the loan interest, pays no tax. If a rate of circa 7% was used, and the loan runs for 15 years, the full amortisation period of the CAIA, that will add another USD 315 billion in Irish tax relief from loan interest charges paid to Jersey) While Apple's CAIA had an ETR of 0%, some have an ETR of 2.5%. (Note: When the Irish State applied a cap of 80% on the total amount of Irish intangible capital allowances that can be used against taxable profits in any year, it gave an Irish effective tax rate (ETR) of 2.5%, being the Irish corporation tax rate of 12.5% multiplied by 20%. Therefore, the ETR of the CAIA is often described as being 0–2.5%, depending on the Irish State rules regarding caps. During Apple's creation of an Irish CAIA BEPS tool in 2015, the CAIA cap was temporarily lifted to 100% (e.g. the ETR was 0%).)

I cannot see a justification for giving large amounts of Irish tax relief to the intragroup acquisition of a virtual group asset, except that it is for the purposes of facilitating corporate tax avoidance.

— Professor Jim Stewart, Trinity College Dublin, "MNE Tax Strategies in Ireland" (2016)

In June 2009, the Irish State established the Commission on Taxation, to review Ireland's tax regime, and included Feargal O'Rourke, the "grand architect" of the Double Irish tool. In September 2009, the commission recommended that the Irish State provide capital allowances for the acquisition of intangible assets, creating the CAIA BEPS tool. The 2009 Finance Act, materially expanded the range of intangible assets attracting Irish capital allowances deductible against Irish taxable profits. These "specified intangible assets" cover more esoteric intangibles such as types of general rights, general know-how, general goodwill, and the right to use software. It includes types of "internally developed" group intangible assets and intangible assets purchased from "connected parties". The control is that the intangible assets must be acceptable under GAAP (older 2004 Irish GAAP is used), and auditable by an Irish IFSC accounting firm, like PwC or Ernst & Young.

In the 2010 Finance Act, on the recommendation of the Department of Finance's Tax Strategy Group, the CAIA BEPS tool was upgraded, reducing the amortisation and "clawback" period from 15 to 10 years, and expanding the range of intangible assets to include "a broader definition of know-how". In the 2011 and 2012 Finance Acts, the Tax Strategy Group made additional amendments to the rules regarding the acquisition of intangible assets from "connected parties", and the "employment tax" users of the CAIA BEPS tool must pay. The 2012 Finance Act removed the minimum amortisation period for the acquired intangible assets, and reduced the "clawback" to 5 years for CAIA schemes set up after February 2013.

The first known user of the CAIA BEPS tool was by Accenture, the first US corporate tax inversion to Ireland in 2009.

By March 2017, Bloomberg would report that Ireland had become the most popular destination for US corporate tax inversions in history, and would have the largest Medtronic (2015), 3rd-largest Johnson Controls (2016), 4th-largest Eaton Corporation (2012) and 6th-largest Perrigo (2013) US corporate tax inversions in history.

=== Basic structure ===
The CAIA follows the first three steps of the Double Irish, and Single Malt, basic structure (see above, except in this case the example is not a per-unit example, but for the entire sales of a block of intellectual property), namely:

1. A US corporate (CORP) develops new software in the US costing $1 million to build;
2. CORP sells it to its wholly owned Bermuda company (BER1) for $1 million (at cost, ideally);
3. BER1 revalues it to $1 billion (as an intangible asset under GAAP), and books gain in Bermuda (tax-free);
4. An Irish subsidiary, IRL1, purchases this intangible asset from BER1, for $1 billion;
5. Under the CAIA rules, IRL1 can write-off the $1 billion paid for this group intangible asset against Irish tax;
6. Additionally, BER1 gives IRL1 a $1 billion 10-year inter-group loan to buy the intangible asset, at an interest rate of circa 7%;
7. Over the next 10 years IRL1 claims tax relief on both the $1 billion purchase (under CAIA), and the inter-group loan interest;
8. During the 10 years, IRL1 charges out this asset to end-customers globally (as per step v. in the Double Irish), accumulating profits;
9. During the 10 years, CORP in line with its product cycle, has created new software and repeated step i. to iii. above;
10. At the end of the 10 years, IRL1 has shielded $1.7 billion of Irish profits against Irish tax;
11. At the end of the 10 years, BER1, who received the $1 billion purchase price, and $0.7 billion in loan interest, has paid no tax;
12. At the end of the 10 years, IRL1, repeats steps iv. to ix. above, and buys a new intangible asset from BER1 for $1 billion.

The CAIA and Double Irish (and Single Malt) share the same basic components and techniques (e.g. an intangible asset needs to be created and significantly re-valued in a tax haven). The key differences between the CAIA BEPS tool and the Double Irish (and Single Malt) BEPS tools are noted as follows:

- CAIA capitalises the effect of the Double Irish in the Irish national accounts, leading to even greater § Distortion of Irish GDP/GNP;
- While the ETR of the Double Irish is close to zero, the Irish State has from time-to-time capped the level of allowances under CAIA to 80%, giving an ETR of 2.5%;
- By providing the inter-group finance to purchase the intangible asset (step vi. above), the tax avoided by CAIA is almost twice that of the Double Irish;
- While the loophole behind the Double Irish has been closed, CAIA is a more established tax concept internationally, although only for tangible assets.

As with all Irish BEPS tools, the Irish subsidiary must conduct a "relevant trade" on the acquired IP. A "business plan" must be produced with Irish employment and salary levels that are acceptable to the Irish State during the period capital allowances are claimed. If the Irish subsidiary is wound up within 5 years, (Note: For CAIA plans after 13 February 2013; before 13 February 2013, it is 10 years) the CAIA intangible capital allowances are repayable, which is called "clawback".

=== Marketing of the CAIA BEPS tool ===
Irish BEPS tools are not overtly marketed, as brochures showing near-zero effective tax rates (ETR) would damage Ireland's ability to sign and operate bilateral tax treaties (i.e. higher-tax countries do not sign full treaties with known tax havens). However, in the Irish financial crisis, some Irish tax law firms in the IFSC produced CAIA brochures openly marketing that its ETR was 2.5%.

Intellectual Property: The effective corporation tax rate can be reduced to as low as 2.5% for Irish companies whose trade involves the exploitation of intellectual property. The Irish IP regime is broad and applies to all types of IP. A generous scheme of capital allowances ... in Ireland offer significant incentives to companies who locate their activities in Ireland. A well-known global company [Accenture in 2009] recently moved the ownership and exploitation of an IP portfolio worth approximately $7 billion to Ireland.

— Arthur Cox Law Firm, (Note: Arthur Cox is Ireland's largest law firm, Matheson describes itself as the Irish law firm with the largest tax practice group, and Maples and Calder is the world's largest offshore magic circle law firm) Uses of Ireland for German Companies (January 2012)

The tax deduction can be used to achieve an effective tax rate of 2.5% on profits from the exploitation of the IP purchased [via the CAIA scheme]. Provided the IP is held for five years, a subsequent disposal of the IP will not result in a clawback.

— Matheson Law Firm, Ireland as a European gateway (March 2013)

Structure 1: The profits of the Irish company will typically be subject to the corporation tax rate of 12.5% if the company has the requisite level of substance to be considered trading. The tax depreciation and interest expense can reduce the effective rate of tax to a minimum of 2.5%.

— Maples and Calder Law Firm, Irish Intellectual Property Tax Regime (February 2018)

=== Apple's "leprechaun economics" (2015) ===
The EU Commission's 30 August 2016 findings against Apple's hybrid–Double Irish BEPS tool, Apple Sales International (ASI), covered the period from 2004 to end 2014 (see above). The EU's August 2016 report on Apple, notes that Apple had informed the commission at the start of 2015 that they had closed their hybrid–Double Irish BEPS tool. In January 2018, Irish economist Seamus Coffey, Chairman of the State's Irish Fiscal Advisory Council, and author of the State's 2017 Review of Ireland's Corporation Tax Code, showed Apple restructured ASI into the CAIA BEPS tool in Q1 2015.

During Q1 2018, Coffey and international economists, proved Ireland's 2015 "leprechaun economics" GDP growth of 33.4%, was attributable to Apple's new CAIA BEPS tool. Coffey noted the significance of Apple's endorsement of the CAIA BEPS tool, given Apple's status as one of the longest users of the Double Irish BEPS tool, and one of the largest users of BEPS tools worldwide.

In January 2018, there was further controversy over Apple's CAIA BEPS tool when Coffey pointed out that it is prohibited under Ireland's tax code (Section 291A(c) of the Taxes Consolidation Act 1997), to use the CAIA BEPS tool for reasons that are not "commercial bona fide reasons", and in schemes where the main purpose is "the avoidance of, or reduction in, liability to tax". In addition, it was realised in hindsight, that changes former Finance Minister Michael Noonan made in the Irish 2015 Finance Budget, was to ensure the ETR of Apple's CAIA tool was reduced to zero.

In June 2018, Apple's post Q1 2015 BEPS tax structure in Ireland was labelled "the Green Jersey" by the EU Parliament's GUE–NGL body and described in detail.

=== Microsoft's Green Jersey (2018) ===
In December 2017, the Irish Government accepted the recommendation of Coffey that corporation tax relief for the Irish CAIA BEPS tool be capped at 80% for new arrangements, to restore the CAIA's effective Irish corporate tax rate (ETR) back to 2.5%. This was enacted in the 2017 Finance Budget, but only for new CAIA BEPS schemes (e.g. Apple's 2015 CAIA scheme would not be affected). Given the dramatic take-up in the CAIA tool in 2015, when the cap lifted (e.g. the ETR was 0%), Irish commentators challenged Coffey's recommendation. He responded in a paper in late 2017.

In 2015 there were a number of "balance-sheet relocations" with companies who had acquired IP while resident outside the country becoming Irish-resident. It is possible that companies holding IP for which capital allowances are currently being claimed could become non-resident and remove themselves from the charge to tax in Ireland. If they leave in this fashion there will be no transaction that triggers an exit tax liability.

— Seamus Coffey, "Intangibles, taxation and Ireland's contribution to the EU Budget", December 2017

In July 2018, it was reported that Microsoft was preparing to execute another "Green Jersey" CAIA BEPS transaction. which, due to technical issues with the TCJA, makes the CAIA BEPS tool attractive to US multinationals. In July 2018, Coffey posted that Ireland could see a "boom" in the onshoring of US IP, via the CAIA BEPS tool, between now and 2020, when the Double Irish is fully closed. In May 2019, it was reported Microsoft moved $52.8bn of IP assets to Ireland. In January 2020, The Irish Times speculated that Google Inc., was also considering using the CAIA BEPS tool.

== Effect of BEPS tools on Ireland's economy ==
In June 2018, academic tax researcher Gabriel Zucman (et alia) estimated Ireland was the world's largest BEPS hub, and also the world's largest tax haven. In September 2018, Zucman and Wright showed that US corporates were the largest users of BEPS tools, representing almost half of all BEPS activity. The concentration of BEPS activity impacted Ireland's economy in a number of ways:

=== Distortion of Irish GDP/GNP ===
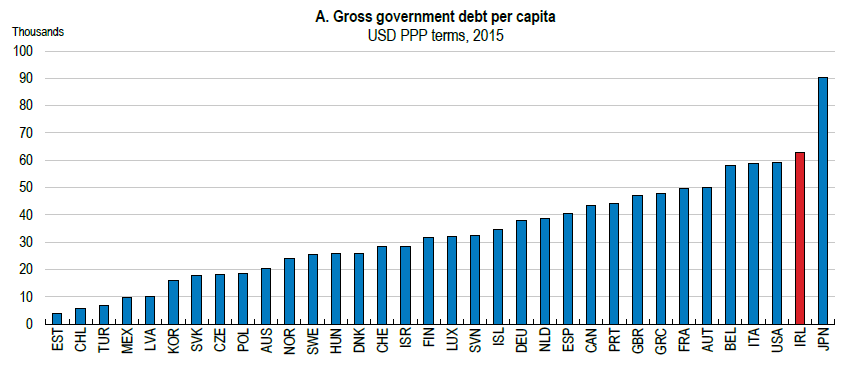
OECD public debt per-capita table for 2015

An "artificially inflated GDP-per-capita statistic", is a feature of tax havens, due to the BEPS flows. In February 2017, Ireland's national accounts became so distorted by BEPS flows that the Central Bank of Ireland replaced Irish GDP and Irish GNP with a new economic measure, Irish Modified GNI*. However, in December 2017, Eurostat reported that Modified GNI* did not remove all of the distortions from Irish economic data. By September 2018, the Irish Central Statistics Office (CSO) reported that Irish GDP was 162% of Irish GNI* (e.g. BEPS tools artificially inflated Ireland's GDP by 62%). In contrast EU–28 2017 GDP was 100% of GNI. Irish public indebtedness changes dramatically depending on whether Debt-to-GDP, Debt-to-GNI* or Debt-per-Capita is used (Per-Capita removes all BEPS tool distortion).

=== Concentration of US multinationals ===
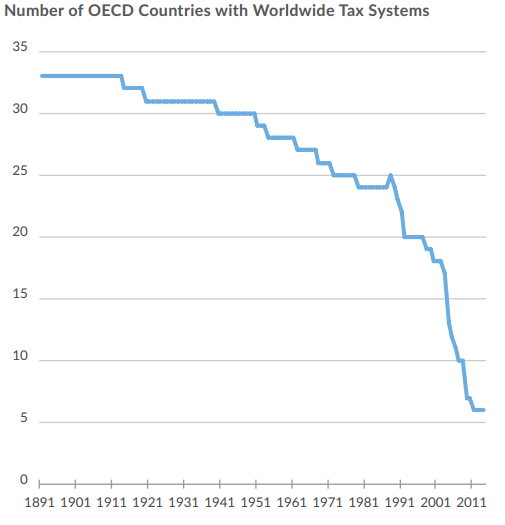
OECD "worldwide tax" countries

Tax academics show multinationals from countries with "territorial" tax systems make little use of tax havens like Ireland. Since the UK changed its tax regime to a "territorial" system in 2009–12, Ireland has failed to attract corporates from any other jurisdiction except the US, one of the last "worldwide" tax systems. By September 2018, US–controlled corporates were 25 of Ireland's 50 largest companies, paid 80% of Irish business taxes, and directly employed 25% of the Irish labour force, and created 57% of Irish value-add. The past president of the Irish Tax Institute stated they pay 50% of all Irish salary taxes (due to higher paying jobs), 50% of all Irish VAT, and 92% of all Irish customs and excise duties. The American-Ireland Chamber of Commerce estimated the value of US investment in Ireland in 2018 was €334 billion, exceeding Irish GDP (€291 billion in 2016), and exceeding the combined investment of US investment in the BRIC countries. The US multinational subsidiaries in Ireland, are not simply used for booking EU sales, in most cases, they handle the entire non-US business of the Group. Apart from US corporates, and legacy UK corporates (pre 2009–12), there are no foreign corporates in Ireland's top 50 firms. Academics say Ireland is more accurately described as a "US corporate tax haven", and a shield for non-US profits from the historic US "worldwide" tax system.

=== Disagreement on Irish ETRs ===
One of the most contested aspects of Ireland's economy is the aggregate "effective tax rate" (ETR) of Ireland's corporate tax regime. The Irish State refutes tax haven labels as unfair criticism of its low, but legitimate, 12.5% Irish corporate tax rate, which it defends as being the effective tax rate (ETR). Independent studies show that Ireland's aggregate effective corporate tax rate is between 2.2% to 4.5% (depending on assumptions made). This lower aggregate effective tax rate is consistent with the individual effective tax rates of US multinationals in Ireland, as well as the IP-based BEPS tools openly marketed by the main Irish tax-law firms, in the IFSC, with ETRs of 0–2.5% (see "effective tax rate").

== Effect of the Tax Cuts and Jobs Act (TCJA) ==
=== US corporate tax haven (to 2017) ===
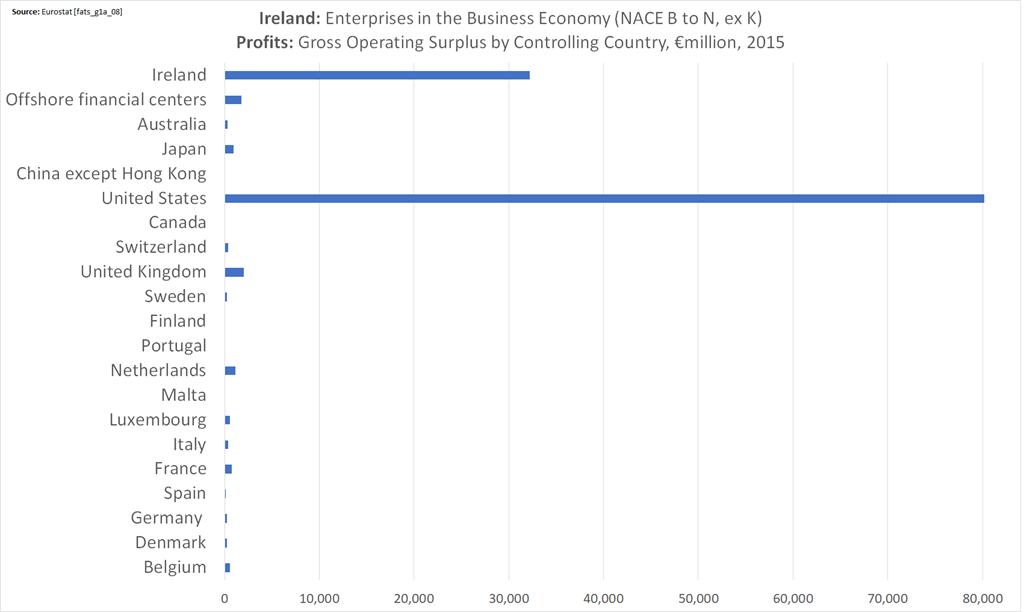
Dominance of US companies: Irish corporate Gross Operating Surplus (i.e. profits), by the controlling country of the company (note: a material part of the Irish figure is also from US tax inversions who are US–controlled). Eurostat (2015).

In June 2018, tax academics showed that Ireland had become the world's largest global BEPS hub, or corporate-focused tax haven. In September 2018, tax academics showed that US multinationals were the largest users of BEPS tools. In 2016, leading tax academic James R. Hines Jr., showed that multinationals from "territorial" tax systems, the system used by almost all global economies bar a handful but which included the US, make little use of tax havens. Hines, and others, had previously quoted the example of the UK, who transitioned from a "worldwide" system to a "territorial" system in 2009–2012, which led to a reversal of many UK inversions to Ireland, and turned the UK into one of the leading destinations for US corporate tax inversions (although Ireland is still the most popular). A similar case study was cited in the switch by Japan in 2009 from a full US "worldwide" tax system (e.g. very high domestic tax rate, partially mitigated by a controlled foreign corporation regime), to a full "territorial" tax system, with positive results.

As discussed in § Controversial closure (2015), Hines had shown as early as 1994, that under the US "worldwide" tax system, US multinational use of tax havens and BEPS tools, had increased long-term US treasury returns. Academics point to these facts as the explanation for the extraordinary § Concentration of US multinationals in Ireland's economy, and the equal failure of Ireland to attract non-US multinationals or any multinationals from "territorial" tax systems. While Ireland sometimes describes itself as a "global knowledge hub for selling into Europe", it is more accurately described as a US corporate tax haven for shielding non-US revenues from the historical US "worldwide" tax system.

=== US change to a territorial system (post 2017) ===
In December 2017, the US Tax Cuts and Jobs Act (TCJA), the US changed from a "worldwide" tax system to a hybrid–"territorial" tax system, (Note: The TCJA's GILTI tax regime, which acts like an international alternative minimum tax for IP–heavy US multinationals, has led some to qualify the new US TCJA system as a hybrid–"territorial" system.) to encourage US multinationals to relocate functions back from tax havens. In addition, the US, as the UK had done in 2009–12, aimed to become a favoured destination for foreign multinational to relocate. In their October 2017 report on the proposed TCJA legalisation, the US Council of Economic Advisors, quoted Hines' work on tax havens, and used Hines' calculations, to estimate the quantum of US investment that should return as a result of the TCJA.

As well as switching to a hybrid–"territorial" tax system, the TCJA contains a unique "carrot" and a "stick" aimed at US multinationals in Ireland:

1. As a "carrot", the TCJA enables these firms to charge out their IP globally (just like with a Double Irish or Single Malt arrangement) but from a US base, at a preferential foreign-derived intangible income (FDII) tax rate of 13.125% . In addition, the extra reliefs of 100% capital expensing, and 21% relief on US costs, make the effective FDII rate 1–2% lower again (or 11–12%).
2. As a "stick", the TCJA’s global intangible low-tax income (GILTI) tax rate forces these firms to pay a minimum US tax rate of 10.5% on their global IP, regardless of where their IP is located. In addition, only getting 80% relief (not 100%), against foreign taxes paid, means that the effective GILTI rate is 1–2% higher again (or 11–12%, similar to the net FDII rate).

In March–April 2018, major US tax law firms showed that pre the TCJA, US multinationals with the IP needed to use Irish BEPS tools, would achieve effective Irish tax rates (ETR) of 0–2.5% (Note: Close to 0% for the Double Irish and Single Malt BEPS tools; 0–2.5% for the CAIA BEPS tool depending on whether the cap on capital allowances was 80% or 100% when the tool was started) versus 35% under the historical US system. However, post the TCJA, these multinationals can use their IP to achieve US ETRs, which net of the TCJA's 100% capital relief provisions, are similar to the ETRs they would achieve in Ireland when the TCJA's new GILTI provisions are taken into account (e.g. ETR of circa 11–12%). In Q1 2018, US multinationals like Pfizer announced in Q1 2018, a post-TCJA global tax rate for 2019 of circa 17%, which is close to the circa 15–16% 2019 tax rate announced by past US corporate tax inversions to Ireland, Eaton, Allergan, and Medtronic.

=== Early implications for Ireland (2018) ===
As the TCJA was being passed in December 2017, the new corporate tax provisions were recognised by the Irish media, as a challenge. Donald Trump had "singled out" Ireland in 2017 speeches promoting the TCJA, and Trump administration economic advisor, Stephen Moore, predicted "a flood of companies" would leave Ireland due to the TCJA. Leading US tax academic, Mihir A. Desai (Note: Desai had written several major academic papers on tax havens with James R. Hines Jr., including the second most cited academic paper on tax havens, The demand for tax haven operations (2006).) in a post–TCJA 26 December 2017 interview in the Harvard Business Review said that: "So, if you think about a lot of technology companies that are housed in Ireland and have massive operations there, they're not going to maybe need those in the same way, and those can be relocated back to the U.S.

In December 2017, U.S technology firm Vantiv, the world's largest payment processing company, confirmed that it had abandoned its plan to execute a corporate tax inversion to Ireland. In March 2018, the Head of Life Sciences in Goldman Sachs, Jami Rubin, stated that: "Now that [US] corporate tax reform has passed, the advantages of being an inverted company are less obvious". In August 2018, US multinational Afilias, who had been headquartered in Ireland since 2001, announced that as a result of the TCJA, it was moving back to the US.

However, in contrast, it was reported in May–July 2018, that US tax academics and tax economists were discovering material technical flaws in the TCJA that incentivise the US use of tax havens like Ireland. Of particular note was the exclusion from the GILTI tax of the first 10% of profits on overseas tangible assets, which incentivises investment in tangible assets abroad. However, a more serious concern, was the acceptance of capital allowances, both tangible and intangible, as deductible against GILTI taxation, which would enable US users of the CAIA BEPS tool to convert their Irish ETR of 0–2.5%, into a final US ETR of 0–2.5%. In May–July 2018, Google and Facebook announced large expansions of their Dublin office campuses in Ireland.

A June 2018 IMF country report on Ireland, while noting the significant exposure of Ireland's economy to US corporates, concluded that the TCJA may not be as effective as Washington expects in addressing Ireland as a US corporate tax haven. In writing its report, the IMF conducted confidential anonymous interviews with Irish corporate tax experts. In July 2018, it was reported that Microsoft was preparing to execute Apple's "Green Jersey" CAIA BEPS transaction. In July 2018, Seamus Coffey, Chairperson of the Irish Fiscal Advisory Council and author of the Irish State's 2016 review of the Irish corporate tax code, posted that Ireland could see a "boom" in the onshoring of US IP, via the CAIA BEPS tool, between now and 2020, when the Double Irish is fully closed.

In February 2019, Brad Setser from the Council on Foreign Relations wrote a New York Times article highlighting material issues with TCJA in terms of combatting tax havens.

== Multinationals that used Irish BEPS tools ==
This is not a comprehensive list as many US multinationals in Ireland use "unlimited liability companies" (ULCs), which do not file public accounts with the Irish CRO.

=== Double Irish ===
Major companies in Ireland known to employ the Double Irish BEPS tool, include:

- Abbott Laboratories
- Adobe Systems
- Airbnb
- Apple Inc. original user, and known in operation since the late 1980s
- Eli Lilly and Company
- Facebook
- Forest Laboratories
- General Electric
- Gilead
- Google
- IBM
- Johnson & Johnson
- Medtronic Inc.
- Microsoft
- News Corp
- Oracle Corp.
- Pfizer Inc.
- Starbucks
- Yahoo!

=== Single malt ===
Major companies in Ireland known to employ the single-malt BEPS tool, include:

- Microsoft (LinkedIn), using Malta
- Allergan (Zeitiq), using Malta
- Teleflex, using Malta
- Abbott Laboratories, using Malta

=== Capital allowances for intangible assets ===
Major companies in Ireland known to employ the capital-allowances for intangible assets (CAIA) BEPS tool, include:

- Apple Inc., started in 2015 with the leprechaun economics affair
- Accenture, started in 2009

== See also ==
- Criticism of Google
- Criticism of Apple Inc.
- Criticism of Facebook
- Taxation in the Republic of Ireland
- Corporation tax in the Republic of Ireland
- EU illegal State aid case against Apple in Ireland
- Corporate tax haven
- Tax haven
- Leprechaun economics Apple BEPS tool in Ireland
- Modified gross national income replaced Irish GDP/GNP
- Green jersey agenda
- Feargal O'Rourke architect of Ireland's BEPS tools
- Matheson (law firm) Ireland's largest US tax advisor
- Qualifying investor alternative investment fund (QIAIF) Irish tax-free vehicles
- Section 110 SPV debt-based BEPS tool
- Conduit and Sink OFCs analysis of tax havens
- Ireland as a tax haven
- Panama as a tax haven
- United States as a tax haven
- James R. Hines Jr., leader in academic research on tax havens
- Dhammika Dharmapala, leader in academic research on tax havens
- Gabriel Zucman, leader in academic research on tax havens
