= The Lonely Battle of Thomas Reid =

Irish documentary film

- Theatrical release poster
- Directed by: Feargal Ward
- Screenplay by: Feargal Ward; Tadhg O'Sullivan
- Produced by: Luke McManus
- Cinematography: Feargal Ward
- Edited by: Tadhg O'Sullivan
- Production company: FSE Films
- Distributed by: FSE Films; Torch Films
- Release dates: 18 November 2017 (IDFA Amsterdam); 19 October 2018 (Ireland)
- Running time: 76–86 minutes (depending on cut)
- Country: Ireland
- Language: English

The Lonely Battle of Thomas Reid is a 2017 Irish documentary film directed by Feargal Ward, concerning the legal struggle between a small farmer and the power of international corporations and government institutions.

== Premise ==
Thomas Reid (born 1962) owns a 72-acre (29 ha) cattle farm in Blakestown townland, west of Leixlip in County Kildare, and right next to Intel Ireland's main campus.

In 2011, IDA Ireland filed for a compulsory purchase order on his farm, with the intention of selling the land to Intel. Reid disputed this in court, saying that CPOs were not intended to be made with the intention of selling property to a specific private company. The case goes to the High Court and Supreme Court, with Reid winning in the end.

Interspersed with reconstructions of the court cases are interviews with Reid, who lives alone in Hedsor, an 18th-century farmhouse that has been in the family for over 100 years, and depictions of his life on the farm.

Reid farmhouse marked on a map of Greater Dublin.

== Release ==
The Lonely Battle of Thomas Reid received its world premiere at the 2017 International Documentary Film Festival Amsterdam.

It went on release in Ireland on 18 October 2018, and aired on Irish television on 1 July 2019.

== Reception ==
The Lonely Battle of Thomas Reid has a 100% rating on Rotten Tomatoes, based on 7 reviews.

Irish Independent film reviewer Paul Whitington included the documentary among his 20 best films of 2018, while in The Herald, Chris Wasser described it as "one of the most unique and, perhaps, indefinable pieces of cinema this year" and "occasionally, quite wonderful".

The film won the George Morrison Feature Documentary Award at the 2018/19 Irish Film and Television Awards, and also won Best Documentary at the 2018 Irish Film Festival London. It was voted Best Irish Film at the 2018 Dublin International Film Festival.
