= Put on the green jersey =

Irish idiom for putting the national interest ahead of other interests

"Put on the green jersey" is a phrase to represent putting the Irish national interest first. The phrase can be used in a positive sense, for example evoking feelings of national unity during times of crisis. The phrase can also be used in a negative sense – e.g. the Irish national interest as an excuse for immoral conduct or corruption. The phrase reflects the wearing of green sports jerseys by most of Ireland's sporting teams.

== Main use ==
=== Political intrigue ===
While the term is used in a range of contexts, it is most common to see it used in a pejorative sense, and to describe taking face saving actions, over unveiling the facts. In this context, it is often used in relation to political situations and the choice between protecting Ireland's international reputation versus the need for public disclosure. The term is invoked frequently in such a manner during debates in the Irish Dáil Éireann (a search of Dáil Éireann debates lists over 400 instances), where opposition members sometimes claim face saving measures are for an incumbent Government's reputation, and not the national interest.

The term can be invoked by an incumbent Government looking for support from opposition parties for a particular course of action on which there is no consensus. In November 2018, the Irish Taoiseach Leo Varadkar was criticised by opposition parties for invoking the Green Jersey in relation to Brexit negotiations, and other matters.

=== Irish financial crisis ===
During State prosecutions of the Irish banking crisis (2014–2018), the derived term green jersey agenda was used to imply that Irish bank CEOs and the Irish State (Department of Finance, Financial Regulator, and the Central Bank), colluded to advocate the build up of credit during the Celtic Tiger period, and then covered up the scale of financial leverage when the banking system began to collapse in 2008. In one particular State prosecution, the Irish Times reported how the State unsuccessfully sought to have the jury prevented from hearing evidence regarding a "green jersey agenda".

=== Ireland Inc. ===
"Green jersey" can appear with the term Ireland Inc., which refers to Ireland behaving like a single company (and taking commercial decisions ahead of other decisions such as social, ethical, or risk). In this context, the term is most often invoked when refuting criticism of Ireland Inc. This was considered to be a factor in the lack of challenge and debate around the extreme build-up of leverage in the Celtic Tiger era (and for which the independent Irish Fiscal Advisory Council was created).

An example was when Irish businessman Denis O'Brien, said in 2018 that the Dublin office market was in a "bubble", which the Irish Taoiseach Leo Varadkar, publicly refuted that day, from the world economic forum in Davos.

== General use ==
The term (and its derived terms), are also invoked as a call to put different interests aside in favour of taking a positive course of action for the Irish national interest. During the 2019 FAI controversies regarding CEO John Delaney, the term was invoked to overhaul the FAI's governance. In the 2019 European elections, it was invoked to show Ireland's commitment to the European Union and rejection of a Brexit agenda. In April 2019, Irish European Commissioner, Phil Hogan, was quoted as describing Europe's support for Ireland's agenda in the Brexit negotiations as "wearing a green jersey".

== Notable use ==
- "This was a cosy culture of common purpose in which the imperative was to keep the boom going, with the government chivvying businessmen to 'pull on the green jersey'. Politics was a catalyst of the crisis, not a restraint." The Financial Times, commenting in 2010 on the origins of the Irish financial crisis under the former Irish Taoiseach Bertie Ahern's administration.
- "The two phrases that summed up the fatuity of Fianna Fáil–led governments under Bertie Ahern and Brian Cowen were (a) 'pull on the green jersey' and (b) 'talking down the economy'." Acclaimed Irish journalist, Fintan O'Toole, commenting in 2012 on why Ireland failed to anticipate the severe property crash of 2009–2012
- "Tánaiste Gilmore has been accused of 'hypocrisy' and 'amnesia' following his comments to the opposition parties that they should 'put on the green jersey' and support the government in its negotiations with the Troika." Irish Tánaiste Eamon Gilmore, asking Irish opposition parties in 2012 to accept proposals of the Troika.
- "He said he was motivated to do this because of his understanding of a request from Pat Neary, the Chief Executive of the Financial Regulator, and the Central Bank governor John Hurley, for the Irish banks to support each other, a so-called 'green jersey' agenda". The 2016 trial of ex. Permanent TSB CEO Denis Casey on his authorisation of €7 billion in loans to support Anglo Irish Bank.
- "I think I pulled on the green jersey in order to compromise in relation to, and agreeing to, an appeal for different reasons, but so that we could move into an era of tax justice." Irish Minister, Katherine Zappone, on RTÉ news as to why she voted to appeal the €13 billion fine against Apple, despite being a supporter of tax justice.
- "But before we all pull on the green Apple jersey, let's stop and think about what we're doing and what we're saying about ourselves to the world." Acclaimed Irish journalist, Fintan O'Toole, commenting on Ireland's decision in 2016 on whether to appeal the EU's € billion fine against Apple, which would be paid to Ireland.
- "Mr Grehan [Senior Counsel for David Drumm] said Mr Drumm answered Ireland's call when it came, donned the green jersey, and did not desert his post at Anglo Irish Bank." The 2018 trial of Anglo Irish Bank CEO David Drumm on his actions as the Irish banking crisis began to unfurl.
- "System failures, administrative errors, endless reviews and prevarications, lost records, putting on the green jersey, alleged lack of resources – all these things have been used to justify wrongdoing. No longer." Taoiseach, Leo Varadkar, in 2017 defending a no-confidence motion regarding the Garda whistleblower scandal.
- "When [MEP] Matt Carthy put that to the Minister's predecessor, (Michael Noonan), his response was that this was very unpatriotic and he should wear the green jersey." TD Pearse Doherty, Sinn Féin Deputy Leader, noting in 2017, Finance Minister Michael Noonan's response to being told the "single malt" had replaced "double Irish", in a Dáil Éireann debate.
