= Edward Kleinbard =

American tax economist (1951–2020)

Edward David Kleinbard (November 6, 1951 – June 28, 2020) was an American lawyer, tax academic, and Ivadelle and Theodore Johnson Professor of Law and Business at USC Gould School of Law. Born in Manhattan, he died of cancer in 2020 at Los Angeles.

== See also ==
- Double Irish, Single Malt, and CAIA, BEPS tools
- Ireland as a tax haven
