= Compulsory purchase order =

Legal instrument in property law in the United Kingdom and Ireland

A compulsory purchase order (CPO; Irish: Ordú Ceannach Éigeantach, Welsh: Gorchymyn prynu gorfodol) is a legal function in the United Kingdom and Ireland that allows certain bodies to obtain land or property without the consent of the owner. It may be enforced if a proposed development is considered one for public betterment; for example, when building motorways where a landowner does not want to sell. Similarly, if town councils wish to develop a town centre, they may issue compulsory purchase orders. CPOs can also be used to acquire historic buildings in order to preserve them from neglect.

Compensation rights usually include the value of the property, costs of acquiring and moving to a new property, and sometimes additional payments. Costs of professional advice regarding compensation are usually reimbursed by the authority, so that people affected by a compulsory purchase order can seek advice from a solicitor and a surveyor and expect to be reimbursed.

== Ireland ==
In Ireland, CPOs became quite common in the early 21st century due to the massive road upgrade programme under the National Development Plan. CPOs are also used for railway or greenway projects. If one objects to the issuing of a CPO, one may appeal to the High Court. Compensation is available to ensure that the person is restored, as far as possible, to the financial position they were in before the land and property were compulsorily purchased.

== United Kingdom ==
In the United Kingdom, most orders are made as subordinate legislation under powers given to local authorities in existing legislation (e.g. an order for road works is made under the Highways Act 1980). Whilst the powers are strong, the authority must demonstrate that the taking of the land is necessary and there is a "compelling case in the public interest". Owners or occupiers can challenge this, and their objection will be heard by an independent inspector.

== See also ==
- Compulsory purchase in England and Wales
- Compulsory Purchase Act 1965
- English land law
- Compulsory purchase laws in Scotland
- Eminent domain
- The Lonely Battle of Thomas Reid
