= Feargal O'Rourke =

Managing partner of PwC, Dublin

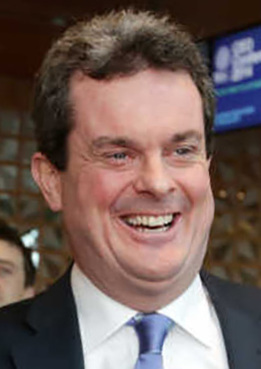
- Feargal O'Rourke in 2014
- Born: 3 August 1964 (age 62); Athlone, Ireland
- Education: Marist College, Athlone
- Alma mater: University College Dublin
- Occupations: Chartered accountant; Tax advisor
- Employers: PricewaterhouseCoopers; Irish government
- Known for: Creating the Double Irish arrangement
- Title: Managing partner, Ireland (July 2015)
- Spouse: Maeve O'Rourke
- Children: 2
- Mother: Mary O'Rourke
- Relatives: Brian Lenihan Snr (uncle); Brian Lenihan Jnr (cousin); Conor Lenihan (cousin)

Feargal O'Rourke (born 3 August 1964) is an Irish accountant and corporate tax expert, who was the managing partner of PwC in Ireland. He developed the Double Irish arrangement used by U.S. firms such as Apple, Google and Facebook in Ireland, and a leader in the development of corporate tax planning tools, (Note: O'Rourke was the most senior tax figure on the 2009 Irish State's Commission on Taxation, which recommended expanding capital allowances to intangible assets, thus creating the CAIA BEPS tool) and tax legislation, for U.S. multinationals in Ireland.

== Personal ==
O'Rourke comes from an established Fianna Fáil political family. He is the son of former Irish minister Mary O'Rourke, nephew of former Irish Tánaiste Brian Lenihan Snr, and cousin of former Irish Finance Minister Brian Lenihan Jnr, and former Irish Minister of State Conor Lenihan.

He chaired the college branch of Fianna Fáil at UCD and joined the national executive on graduation.

== Double Irish ==
O'Rourke was once labeled the "great architect" of the "Double Irish" base erosion and profit shifting ("BEPS") tool, as used by U.S. multinationals in Ireland such as Google, a known client of O'Rourke's, Facebook, and Apple. O'Rourke's work on Google's BEPS tools featured in a 2018 book by Richard Brooks:

With pressure on the Dutch Government to stop functioning as a tax avoidance conduit, in 2010 O'Rourke successfully lobbied for withholding taxes paid on royalties paid out of Ireland to be scrapped altogether [removing the need for the Dutch Sandwich component of the double Irish BEPS tool].

— Richard Brooks, Bean Counters: The Triumph of the Accountants and how they broke Capitalism (June 2018)

The €13 billion fine levied by the EU Commission on Apple's Double Irish BEPS tool, for Irish taxes avoided from 2004 to 2014, is the largest corporate tax fine in history. O'Rourke's PwC (Ireland) tax practice represented the Irish State in its tax defence, during the commission's Apple investigation. (Note: There is no verifiable reference as to whether Apple is a client of PWC Ireland) O'Rourke rejects the labels, but also rejects the notion that the Irish tax code shouldn't legally, and transparently, exploit loopholes in the US tax code:

Feargal O'Rourke: "Why should Ireland be the policeman for the US?" he asks. "They can change the law like that!" He snaps his fingers. "I could draft a bill for them in an hour." "Under no circumstances is Ireland a tax haven. I'm a player in this game and we play by the rules."

— Jesse Drucker, Bloomberg, Man Making Ireland Tax Avoidance Hub Proves Local Hero, 28 October 2013

Other Irish financial commentators have taken a different view on this strategy:

O'Rourke and other accountants like him "think up these tax strategies and the impact is tens of billions in lost tax revenue in Europe, the US and less-developed countries", says Jim Stewart, associate professor of finance at Trinity College's school of business. "He's a very aggressive leader of the tax-avoidance industry here."

— Jesse Drucker, Bloomberg, Man Making Ireland Tax Avoidance Hub Proves Local Hero, 28 October 2013

In October 2013, O'Rourke predicted the end of the Double Irish, which was closed to new entrants in January 2015. New Irish BEPS tools replaced it: the Single Malt scheme (used by Microsoft and Allergan), and the Capital Allowances for Intangible Assets ("CAIA") scheme, (used by Apple in its Q1 2015 restructuring). It was O'Rourke's 2009 Commission on Taxation, that recommended expanding Irish capital allowances tax scheme to intangible assets creating the CAIA BEPS tool in the 2009 Finance Act. Accenture was an early user of the CAIA BEPS tool, when it executed the first corporate tax inversion to Ireland in 2009.

== Effective tax rates ==
In January 2014, O'Rourke publicly defended Ireland's BEPS tools, when the U.S. Bureau of Economic Analysis (BEA) method of calculating effective tax rates (ETRs), showed Ireland's corporate ETR was between 2.2% to 3.8%. It renewed international controversy on Ireland as a corporate tax haven. O'Rourke defended Ireland's ETR as being close to the headline Irish corporate tax rate of 12.5%, and quoted the World Bank/PwC survey. In one February 2014 radio interview, O'Rourke asserted that "there was a hole the size of the Grand Canyon", in the BEA analysis of Ireland's ETR.

The disconnect lies in the distinction between Ireland's corporation tax "regime" versus Ireland's corporation tax "rate", which was highlighted by the EU Commission's 2016 findings against Apple's double Irish tax system in Ireland. According to the Irish Revenue, Apple had been paying the full Irish 12.5% tax rate on what Revenue considered to be "taxable profits" in Ireland The EU Commission found a very different situation:

Selective treatment allowed Apple to pay an effective corporate tax rate of 1 per cent on its European profits in 2003 down to 0.005 per cent in 2014.

— Margrethe Vestager, "State aid (SA.38373): Ireland gave illegal tax benefits to Apple worth up to €13 billion", 30 August 2016.

Experts note the potency of Ireland's corporation tax regime, and O'Rourke's BEPS tools, as opposed to the headline 12.5% corporate tax rate.

Applying a 12.5% rate in a tax code that shields most profits from taxation, is indistinguishable from applying a near 0% rate in a normal tax code.

— Jonathan Weil, Bloomberg View, 11 February 2014

== Legacy ==
The ETRs of 0–2.5% from O'Rourke's BEPS tools have drawn international criticism. Academic research has shown Ireland as a major tax haven, and in June 2018 tax academics showed Ireland to be the largest global tax haven, helping U.S. multinationals to shield over $100 billion in annual profits from Irish and U.S. taxation.

O'Rourke's defense of Ireland's low corporate ETRs for U.S.–controlled multinationals is part of Ireland's "green jersey agenda" to advance "Ireland Inc." over other potential consequences, such as reputation or financial risk, which is not an uncommon political strategy in Ireland.

Regardless of the tax losses to other nations, O'Rourke's BEPS tools have brought prosperity to Ireland. 25 of Ireland's top 50 firms (by turnover) are U.S.–controlled multinationals, employing one quarter of Ireland's private sector workforce, paying 80% of Irish business taxes, and creating 57% of Irish private sector non-farm value-add in Ireland. (see low tax economy). O'Rourke's BEPS tools however have been less effective in attracting non–U.S. multinationals to Ireland, or more accurately, multinationals from "territorial" tax systems (e.g. the U.K post their 2009 transformation to a "territorial" tax system).

Bloomberg noted in October 2013 that O'Rourke is regarded a "hero" in Ireland. He is a sought after commentator on the Irish economy, and on Irish corporate taxation policy. O'Rourke has sat on several major Irish State taxation review groups, including the major 2009 Commission on Taxation, and is one of the 5 people named in Ireland's "Independent Persons of Standing" list under the Double Taxation Arbitration Convention.

In February 2014, he was named in The Irish Times 50 people who run Ireland list. O'Rourke sits on the Board of the American Chamber of Commerce Ireland, the lobby group for U.S. multinationals in Ireland. In March 2018, he noted the U.S. Tax Cuts and Jobs Act of 2017 will be a challenge to Ireland's U.S. economic model but that Ireland should be able to withstand it. In April 2018, he advised that the Irish State should build a rainy day fund. O'Rourke maintains an active Twitter account.

== See also ==
- EU illegal state aid case against Apple in Ireland
