= Seamus Coffey =

Irish economist

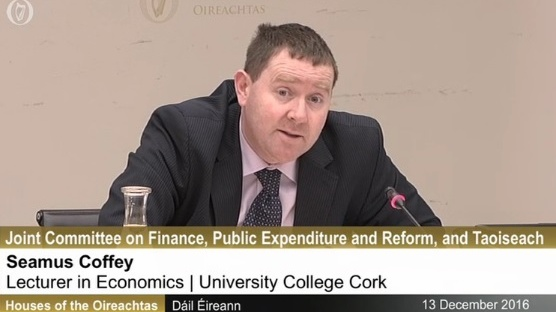
- Seamus Coffey, testifying to the Joint Committee on Finance (Dec 2016)
- Born: 1977 or 1978 (age 47–48); Cappamore, Limerick, Ireland
- Citizenship: Irish

Academic background
- Education: University College Cork

Academic work
- Discipline: Public economics, Corporate tax
- Institutions: University College Cork
- Notable ideas: Corporate tax (Coffey Report)
- Awards: Eisenhower Fellow
- Website: Economic Incentives (blog)

Seamus Coffey is an Irish economist and media contributor with a focus on the performance of the Irish economy and Irish macroeconomic and fiscal policy. He is a lecturer at University College Cork. He is chair of the Irish Fiscal Advisory Council (IFAC) since August 2024, having previously served in the same role from January 2017 to December 2019.

== Career ==
Coffey authored the Irish state's review of the Irish corporate tax code in 2016 (the Coffey Report), whose findings were implemented in 2017–2018. His bi-annual statutory IFAC reports on the sustainability of Irish State finances are covered in the Irish and international media. In December 2017, International Tax Review named Coffey in its 2017 Global Tax 50. Coffey maintains an economics blog called Economic Incentives, which was the first to show the source of Ireland's 2015 distorted GDP growth was Apple.

Coffey has won praise amongst financial commentators for the independence of IFAC's reports, and his role of 'financial watchdog' of state finances.

== See also ==
- Morgan Kelly (economist)

== Sources ==
- REVIEW OF IRELAND’S CORPORATION TAX CODE – 2016 (Coffey Report), from the Department of Finance (Ireland) Website
