= Capital allowance =

Capital allowances is the practice of allowing tax payers to get tax relief on capital expenditure by allowing it to be deducted against their annual taxable income. Generally, expenditure qualifying for capital allowances will be incurred on specified capital assets, with the deduction available normally spread over many years. The term is used in the UK and in Ireland.

Capital allowances are a replacement of accounting depreciation, which is not generally an allowable deduction in UK and Irish tax returns. Capital allowances can therefore be considered a form of 'tax depreciation', a term more widely used in other tax jurisdictions such as the US. If capital expenditure does not qualify for a form of capital allowance, then it means that the business gets no immediate tax relief on such expenditure.

== Categories of asset ==
Capital allowances were introduced in the UK in 1946 and may be claimed for:

- plant and machinery
- structures and buildings
- business premises renovation (abolished for expenditure from April 2018)
- flat conversion
- mineral extraction
- research and development
- know-how
- patents
- dredging
- assured tenancies

Historically, there have also been capital allowances for industrial and agricultural buildings. These have now been phased out, though an allowance may now be claimed for features integral to a building

== Plant and machinery allowances ==
The far most commonly claimed form of capital allowances in the UK are plant and machinery allowances.

Neither term is defined in legislation, though guidance is given by HMRC

HMRC view machinery as being anything that has a moving part. It does not have to be mechanically powered, so a hand-operated device qualifies.

The term "plant" is defined in case law, including Yarmouth v France which was not a tax case. This held that plant "includes whatever apparatus is used by a businessman for carrying on his business - not his stock in trade, which he buys or makes for sale; but all goods and chattels, fixede or dead, which he keeps for permanent employment in his business". In that case, it was held that his employer's horse was plant.

The scope of exactly what comes within the definition has been the subject of many cases. Among the more important cases, the following have been held to be plant:

- a shoe maker's knife that lasted for two years, but not one that lasted for less than two years
- a large dry dock, which was held to be equipment rather than premises
- swimming pools at a caravan park
- artificial football pitch, held not to be part of the premises
- grain silos
- law books owned by a barrister
- gazebo for smokers in the garden of a pub
- decorative screens in the window of building society branches.

Where a plant and machinery allowances claim has been made on a property a new purchaser, in most cases, will be restricted to the Sellers disposal value for the plant and machinery. Further claims can be made on a property where it is extended or re-developed but only on those new elements of plant and machinery fixtures introduced to the building.

The amount of the allowance depends on what is claimed for. In some cases, the rates are different in the year a business entity made the purchase from those in subsequent years.

A business operator cannot claim capital allowances for things bought or sold: these are claimed as business expenses. If a business asset is bought on a hire purchase basis, the original cost of the item can be claimed as a capital allowance, but the interest and other charges count as business expenses.

== Types of allowance ==
The main types of capital allowance are:

- annual investment allowance (AIA) introduced from 1 April 2008
- first year allowance (FYA)
- writing down allowance (WDA).
- balancing allowance (BA).

AIA is claimed for plant and machinery, with some exceptions such as for cars. It is fixed amount regardless of the size of the business and so is worth proportionately more for smaller businesses. The amount has varied many times since its introduction. In the 2015 summer Budget it was announced that it would be fixed at £200,000 until 2020.

FYA may be claimed in the tax year in which the asset was acquired. It has largely been replaced by AIA. It may still be claimed for certain energy-saving products.

WDA applies to such amounts of allowable expenditure that are not relieved by either AIA or FYA. Broadly it requires all assets to be put into either a general pool, a special pool or a single-asset pool. Assets in the general pool are written down at 18% while those in the special pool are written down at 8%. An asset in a single-asset pool is written down at either 8% or 18% depending on its nature. The advantage is that, on disposal, the whole of the written down value may be offset against taxable profits. The whole balance of a pool may be written off if it falls below £1,000.

BA applies when a business ceases.

== Technical considerations ==
Capital allowance reliefs can be set against the client's taxable profits reducing the amount payable. Companies pay Corporation Tax at 19% (2018 figure), whilst individuals pay tax at 20%, 40% or 45%. Please note as it is an allowance against taxable profit, you have to be a tax payer to benefit, therefore this does not normally apply to property owned in SIPPS or by charities and trusts. Allowances are generated when a business client builds or acquires commercial property. The amount of plant contained within the building or acquired property is the key to maximising the relief.

The claim should be considered as an effective discount and cash contribution to the construction cost or purchase price. The claim provides a tax saving that accrues over time. It is possible to claim allowances on investment properties but plant let in a "dwelling house" is excluded. Blocks of flats, halls of residence etc. will therefore qualify.

For property that is being acquired, the specialist can apportion the purchase price under a recognised HMRC formula, and this is where the inherent property skill can maximise the claim with optimal costing of the plant contained within the property

== See also ==
- Amortization (tax law)
- Depreciation
- Capital allowances for intangible assets (Irish)
