= Irish Fiscal Advisory Council =

Oversight of Irish State budget

- Type: Independent statutory body
- Genre: Independent fiscal watchdog
- Founded: July 2011 (interim); 12 December 2012 (statutory basis)
- Headquarters: Whitaker Square (ESRI Building), Sir John Rogerson's Quay, Dublin, Ireland
- Area served: Ireland
- Key people: Seamus Coffey (chairperson); Michael McMahon; Stephen Millard; Alessandro Giustiniani
- Products: Statutory body that conducts independent budgetary oversight of Ireland's Government finances, the appropriateness of the overall fiscal stance, compliance with fiscal rules, assessments of Government's forecasts and an endorsement function (endorsing the Government's macroeconomic forecasts)
- Website: www.fiscalcouncil.ie

Irish Fiscal Advisory Council (Fiscal Council; Irish: Comhairle Chomhairleach Bhuiséadach na hÉireann) is a non-departmental statutory body providing independent assessments and analysis of the Irish Government's fiscal stance, its economic and budgetary forecasts, and its compliance with fiscal rules. The Fiscal Council was created in July 2011 as part of a wider agenda of budgetary reform after the 2008 financial crisis.

The establishment of a fiscal council had been proposed domestically in the National Recovery Plan 2011-2014 and by the Joint Committee on Finance and the Public Service in November 2010. It also became a requirement of the EU/IMF Programme of Financial Support for Ireland (December 2010). Its establishment follows moves to establish independent watchdogs internationally as a means of avoiding repeats of fiscal crises and to promote more transparency around the public finances.

== Purpose ==
The Fiscal Council was formed as part of a programme of reform of Ireland's "budgetary architecture" post the Irish economic crisis. It was established on an interim basis in July 2011, and legally constituted under the Fiscal Responsibility Act 2012 which was part of the EU-IMF Programme of Financial Support for Ireland (and whose terms required the creation of a "budgetary advisory council to provide an independent assessment of Government forecasts").

The formation of the Fiscal Council was a response to the perceived failure of established Irish economic and Irish regulatory institutions to anticipate and warn over the consequences of the Irish credit bubble and/or to engage in the concerns that were being raised by various international monitors at the time (IMF and OECD) regarding Ireland's economic situation.

The Fiscal Council performs a similar role to the "Office for Budget Responsibility" in the United Kingdom (also formed after the financial crisis), and other equivalent members of the "Network of European Union Independent Fiscal Institutions" (which the Fiscal Council joined in September 2015).

It is structured as a council of five members (one chairperson) and a supporting analytical team of about seven.

The formal mandate of the Irish Fiscal Advisory Council (per its website) is to:

- Assess and endorse the Irish Government's official macroeconomic forecasts.
- Assess the Irish Government's budgetary forecasts.
- Assess the broader fiscal stance of the Irish Government.
- Monitor compliance with legislated fiscal rules by the Irish Government.

The Fiscal Council has been well received by Irish financial commentators and its publications are widely covered in the Irish media.

== Publications ==
The key mandated publications of the Irish Fiscal Advisory Council are:

- Bi-annual Fiscal Assessment Report (FAR) (produced after the Irish autumn Budget, and the spring Stability Update).
- Bi-annual Endorsement Letters of macroeconomic forecasts (produced in advance of the Irish autumn Budget, and the spring Stability Update).
- Annual Pre-Budget Statement (produced before the Irish autumn Budget).
- Annual Ex-Post Assessment of Compliance with the Domestic Budgetary Rule.

The Irish Fiscal Advisory Council commenced an annual conference titled “Path for the Public Finances” in March 2017. The goal is to bring attention to long-term Irish State finance issues relevant for Ireland. International speakers attend. Each annual event is intended to focus on a particular theme, which has been:

- March 2017 Path for the Public Finances: Fiscal Risks.
- March 2018 Path for the Public Finances: Too Hot, Too Cold! The Irish Cycle.
- March 2019 Path for the Public Finances: Long-Term Fiscal Sustainability
- February 2020 Path for the Public Finances: Budgeting for Climate Change
- February 2021 Path for the Public Finances: Ensuring debt sustainability in a post-Covid world
- February 2022 Path for the Public Finances: Ramping up public investment and getting better value for money
- March 2023 Path for the Public Finances: Saving for our Future
- February 2024 Path for the Public Finances: Climate change revisited
- February 2025 Path for the Public Finances: Bridging gaps and building for our future

The Fiscal Council also publishes analytical notes and working papers in areas of concern to the Irish economy and public finances (including tax receipts, public debt, EU rules/guidelines, infrastructure and climate change).

== Focus ==
The Fiscal Council focuses on macro-fiscal issues; that is, issues that relate to the whole economy as well as to the public finances in Ireland. Its output typically covers a recent and future macroeconomic outlook, both from a short-term (demand-side) and medium- to long-term (supply-side) perspective. It puts more weight on the longer-term prospects of the domestic economy in terms of its assessments of how appropriate the Government's budgetary stance is. It also focuses on the cyclical position of the economy to assess whether recent developments might be of a sustainable nature or whether the economy might be expected to outperform or under perform in future. It also puts emphasis on analysing various imbalances and risks to the economy and public finances.

The council has brought attention to issues including:

- the risks associated with the Government's reliance on corporation tax receipts to fund public services as well as the concentration, volatility, and unpredictable nature of corporation tax receipts.
- improving analysis of the more tax-rich domestic economy (ignoring distortions present in GDP) and its cyclical performance
- measuring uncertainty around macroeconomic and budgetary forecasts
- ways to improve Ireland's budgetary framework (including through assessments of how a "rainy day fund" could be redeveloped, how medium-term spending by Government could be better anchored, and how the Government's debt targets could be better devised).

== Council ==
=== Chairperson ===
- 2011-2016: UCG Professor John McHale.
- 2016-2019: UCC economist Seamus Coffey.
- 2020-2023: Sebastian Barnes
- 2023-2024: Professor Michael McMahon
- 2024–present: UCC economist Seamus Coffey

=== Council members ===
As of 2024, council members include:

- Seamus Coffey (Chair)
- Michael McMahon
- Alessandro Giustiniani
- Stephen Millard

== See also ==
- Central Bank of Ireland
- Central Statistics Office (Ireland)
- Economic and Social Research Institute
