= Matthew Elderfield =

British financial regulator (born 1966)

- Born: 12 January 1966
- Occupations: Head of Financial Regulation, Central Bank of Ireland.
- Known for: Financial Regulation

Matthew Elderfield (born 12 January 1966) was Deputy Governor and Head of Financial Regulation at the Central Bank of Ireland, a position sometimes referred to colloquial in Ireland as the Financial Regulator between January 2010 and October 2013. He is also the former chief executive of the Bermuda Monetary Authority (BMA).

== Education ==
Elderfield graduated from Cambridge University in 1988 with a master's degree in International relations, and earned a bachelor's degree in foreign service, cum laude, from the School of Foreign Service, Georgetown University in 1987.

He was at asked at a parliamentary committee "In regard to baseline qualifications, if your staff is regulating the financial sector, should it not be the case where they should have the bare minimum required in the market as well, a qualified financial adviser status, or they've gone through certain industry exams. It's obviously important to have." But Mr Elderfield disagreed: "I don't agree with that. But I think I'm conflicted because I've never taken a professional exam in my life."

== Career ==
Elderfield was chief executive of the Bermuda Monetary Authority (BMA, the financial services sector in Bermuda) from July 2007. During his two years as head of the financial regulator in Bermuda, Elderfield introduced reforms to strengthen the island's reputation for international insurance, banking and fund management. He strengthened regulation in Bermuda by significantly increasing staff numbers, expanding the BMA's learning and development programme, and introducing a scoring system for management.

Prior to joining the BMA, Elderfield spent eight years at the UK Financial Services Authority (FSA) as a head of a number of departments responsible for exchange and clearing-house supervision of secondary markets, listing policy and for banking supervision. He was the official responsible for supervising Northern Rock in the months before the collapsed bank applied for its first bailout. He represented the FSA on the Basel Accord Implementation Group and chaired the FSA panel responsible for economic capital model review.

Before joining the FSA, Elderfield established the European operation of the International Swaps and Derivatives Association (ISDA) and held position at the London Investment Banking Association, the British Bankers Association and a Washington DC–based consultancy firm, the Institute for Strategy Development.

Elderfield earned an annual salary of €340,000 a year at the Central Bank of Ireland compared to a salary of $730,000 (€533,000) in Bermuda and was said to be at his desk from 7.30am to 7pm on weekdays while working a half-day on Sundays.

== Appointment as financial regulator in Ireland ==
Elderfield was appointed in October 2009 by the Governor of the Central Bank, Patrick Honohan. He succeeded Patrick Neary, who retired early over the handling of the regulator's investigation into the €87 million in secret directors' loans at Anglo Irish Bank. Minister for Finance, Brian Lenihan welcomed his appointment, saying: "The appointment of Mr Elderfield, particularly given his extensive international regulatory experience, is a key step in the restructuring of financial services regulation in Ireland." He took up his position in January 2010. He has been tasked with the rebuilding of the financial regulators function and restoring its reputation, overseeing the recapitalisation of the banks, helping to wean them off the funding support of Government guarantees, match Ireland's regulatory changes with the raft of measures coming internationally, and strike a measured balance in his approach to maintain a competitive position for the Irish financial services sector at a global level. Mr Elderfield said he intended to pursue a policy of 'assertive' regulation, backed up by the credible threat of enforcement. An Irish Times poll suggests that he is meeting success in restoring credibility to the Financial Regulators office with 68% responding positively. In April 2010 he said that there was "critical absence of intellectual firepower within his staff

=== Notable decisions made ===
==== Capital requirements for banks ====
Following the transfer of loans to NAMA at the end of March 2010, the regulator's office announced under the Government's guarantee scheme must now meet a core equity ratio of 8 per cent by the end of 2010. This is to ensure that they can withstand future losses.

==== Appointment of administrator to Quinn Insurance ====
On 30 March 2010, following an application by the Financial Regulator's office, the High Court appointed joint provisional administrators to Quinn Insurance Limited, part of the Quinn Group of companies. According to the Irish Independent, eight subsidiaries of Quinn Insurance provided guarantees of €1.2bn to cover Quinn Group's debts, prompting the regulator to seek the appointment of provisional administrators in the High Court. The Quinn Group took action to counter the moves by the Financial Regulator, mobilising its employees into street protests, financial discussions with its creditors, in an effort to seek a resolution to the uncertainty created by the appointment of provisional administrators to Quinn Insurance. On 15 April 2010, the Irish Times reported that Quinn Insurance decided not to fight the appointment of a permanent administrator. This was following a direct challenge by Elderfield to the groups owner, Irelands former richest man, Sean Quinn, to "Show me the money" that would have solved the financial difficulties.

== Personal ==
He is a British citizen and is married. His interests are cycling, Leeds United, music and lives in Sandymount, Dublin.

== See also ==
- Irish property bubble
- Post-2008 Irish economic downturn
