= Sharon Donnery =

Irish economist, senior official at the ECB and former Central Bank deputy governor

Member of the Supervisory Board of the European Central Bank (ECB representative)
- Incumbent
- Assumed office January 2025

Deputy Governor (Financial Regulation), Central Bank of Ireland
- In office 2022 – December 2024
- Governor: Gabriel Makhlouf
- Succeeded by: Mary Elizabeth McMunn

Governor of the Central Bank of Ireland Acting
- In office 2 June 2019 – 31 August 2019
- Taoiseach: Leo Varadkar
- Preceded by: Philip R. Lane
- Succeeded by: Gabriel Makhlouf

Deputy Governor (Central Banking), Central Bank of Ireland
- In office 1 March 2016 – 2022
- Governor: Philip R. Lane; Gabriel Makhlouf
- Preceded by: Stefan Gerlach

Personal details
- Born: Sharon Martina Donnery; 1 November 1972 (age 53) Dublin, Ireland
- Education: University College Dublin

Sharon Donnery (born 1972) is an Irish economist and experienced central banker and financial regulator/supervisor. Since January 2025, she has served as an ECB representative on the Supervisory Board of the Single Supervisory Mechanism. At the ECB, she is an ECB representative to the Supervisory Board - the main operational decision-making body for banking supervision. Her portfolio at the ECB includes international relations, geopolitical risk, stress testing and supervisory strategy/priorities.

She previously served as a Deputy Governor of the Central Bank of Ireland from March 2016 to December 2024. She served as the Governor of the Central Bank of Ireland on an acting basis from June 2019 to August 2019, having occupied increasingly senior positions in economics (including monetary policy and financial stability), consumer protection and regulatory roles since joining the body in 1996. As of 1 July 2022, she was responsible for financial regulation in Ireland. The legislation underpinning the role of the Central Bank of Ireland sets out four statutory positions: Governor, Head of Central Banking, Head of Financial Regulation and Registrar of Credit Unions. As of end 2025, Donnery has the distinction of being the only person to have held all four positions, albeit that she occupied the Governor role on an acting basis.

== Career ==
Educated at undergraduate (BA in Economics and Politics 1993) and postgraduate (MA in Economics 1994) level at University College Dublin, Donnery joined the Central Bank of Ireland in 1996, working initially in the Monetary Policy Division. She was the first woman to be appointed as one of the Deputy Governors of the Central Bank of Ireland.

Prior to joining the Central Bank, she worked at Maynooth University, as a lecturer in Economics. She has noted that when she joined the organisation that there was no woman at either senior management or head of division level and that this would not change until 2001. Having progressed through the organisation and served as Head of Consumer Protection, she was appointed to the statutory role of Registrar of Credit Unions in 2013. While in a consumer protection leadership role, she was Chair of the European Banking Authority's (EBA) Consumer Protection Group and Vice-Chair of the EBA Standing Committee on Consumer Protection and Financial Innovation; she later continued involvement in international policy-making. She was subsequently promoted to Director of Credit Institutions Supervision in 2014, succeeding Fiona Muldoon. She was appointed by the European Central Bank to act as Chair of the ECB High Level Group on Non-Performing Loans (NPLs). The group produced ECB guidance on Non-Performing Loans and a review of relevant practices across Europe. She was appointed Chair of the ECB's Budget Committee in 2016 - this being one of only two ECB committees not chaired by an ECB executive - succeeding Pentti Hakkarainen.

In 2016, Donnery was appointed to the role of Deputy Governor (Central Banking), succeeding Stefan Gerlach. She was the first woman to be appointed to one of the Deputy Governor roles. In 2018, she was shortlisted as one of two contenders nominated by MEPs to head the ECB Supervisory Board, eventually losing out to Andrea Enria. On the departure of Philip R. Lane, she was appointed Acting Governor from June to August 2019, the first woman to lead the Central Bank, albeit on a temporary basis. According to media reporting, Donnery was one of five shortlisted candidates for the post of Governor, with Gabriel Makhlouf ultimately appointed and taking up the role from 1 September 2019.

In 2020, she was appointed as an adjunct professor of economics at Trinity College Dublin and was named as UCD Alumni Award winner for the social sciences. Holder of a diploma from the Institute of Directors, Donnery was, in 2019, registered by that body as a Chartered Director.

In 2022, it was announced that Donnery had been appointed Deputy Governor (Financial Regulation), responsible for leading the supervision of credit institutions, and the insurance sector, as well as policy and risk, and the prudential analytics and inspections directorates, with a team over 600. In this role she would also be a member of the ECB Supervisory Board, the body responsible for the ECB's supervisory tasks.

Government offices
| Preceded by Philip R. Lane | Governor of the Central Bank of Ireland (Acting); 2019 | Succeeded by Gabriel Makhlouf |
