= Joseph Brennan (civil servant) =

Irish economist and government official

- Brennan in 1920

Governor of the Central Bank of Ireland
- In office 1 January 1943 – 22 October 1953
- Taoiseach: Éamon de Valera
- Preceded by: New office
- Succeeded by: James McElligott

Personal details
- Born: Joseph Brennan; 18 November 1887 Cork, Ireland
- Died: 19 March 1976 (aged 88) Phibsborough, Dublin, Ireland
- Spouse: Evelyn Simcox (m. 1913; d. 1976)
- Children: 3
- Education: Christ Church, Cambridge

Joseph Brennan (18 November 1887 – 19 March 1976) was an Irish economist and senior Irish civil servant who served as the Governor of the Central Bank of Ireland from 1943 to 1953.

== Early life and family ==
Brennan was born in Cork on 18 November 1887. His parents were Joseph (died 1948), a businessman, and Mary Brennan (née Hickey)The family home was at Hill Terrace Bandon, County Cork. He attended a local national school, and then Clongowes Wood College from 1899 to 1905. He studied at University College Dublin before entering Christ Church, Cambridge in 1909, where he studied Mathematics and then switched to classics. In successive years he obtained a first in Latin and Greek.

In September 1918, he married Evelyn Simcox, and the couple had one son and two daughter. Their son, Peter born in 1920, died in 1927. The family lived at Crinken House, Shankill, and then Clancool, Shrewsbury Road.

== Career ==
In 1911, he entered the British civil service and was assigned to the Board of Customs and Excise at the Port of London, and a year later transferred to the finance division of the Chief Secretary's office in Dublin Castle.

During the July 1921 Truce, he was introduced to Michael Collins and later became a financial advisor to the team negotiating the Anglo-Irish Treaty.

In April 1922, he became the Irish Free State's first Comptroller and Auditor General and in April of the following year, he was appointed Secretary of the Department of Finance, a post he held until he retired from the Civil Service in 1927. Later that year he was appointed chairman of the Currency Commission.

In 1925, his lengthy note on the Free State's financial position helped conclude the Irish Boundary Commission negotiations. When the Currency Commission was dissolved in 1943, he became the first Governor of the Central Bank of Ireland. From 1928 until his retirement in 1953 his signature appeared on all Irish banknotes.

In 1938, Joseph Brennan was conferred with an Honorary LLD by the National University of Ireland.

== Death and legacy ==
He was noted as "high-minded, shy, but arrogant and caustic man" who "lived an austere, frugal life". Brennan died at his home, Clancool, on 3 March 1976. The National Library of Ireland hold his papers.
