= St Paul's, Cambridge =

- Parish Church of St Paul, Cambridge
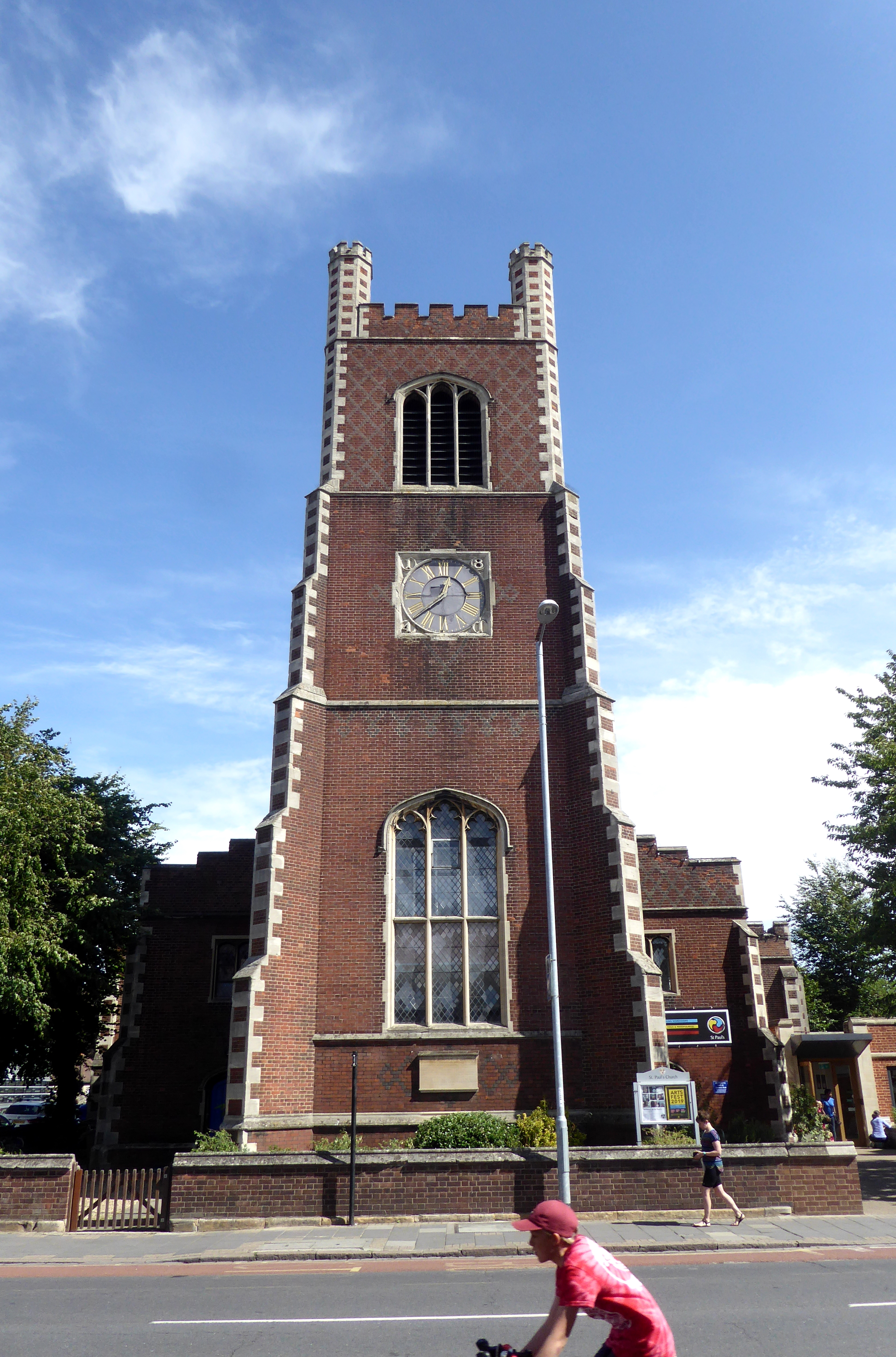
- St Paul's from Hills Road
- St Paul's, Cambridge
- 52.197586°N 0.129446°E
- Location: Hills Road, Cambridge, CB2 1JP
- Country: England
- Denomination: Church of England
- Website: www.stpaulscambridge.org.uk

Architecture
- Architect(s): Ambrose Poynter, H. G. Elborne, Temple Moore
- Years built: 1841

Administration
- Province: Province of Canterbury
- Diocese: Diocese of Ely
- Archdeaconry: Archdeaconry of Cambridge
- Deanery: Cambridge South Deanery
- Parish: St. Paul, Cambridge

St Paul's, Cambridge is a Church of England parish church situated 0.8 miles (1.3 km) to the south east of the city centre of Cambridge, on the corner of St Paul's Road with Hills Road. St Paul's is part of the Cambridge South Deanery in the Anglican Diocese of Ely. The church is a Grade II Listed Building and has a place in the history of the Gothic Revival due to criticism from the Cambridge Camden Society in the first issue of The Ecclesiologist.

Since 2022, the vicar of St Paul's is Imogen Nay.

== History ==
Charles Perry, later first Anglican Bishop of Melbourne, was the first Vicar of St Paul's, 1842–47. Perry had bought the advowson for the living of St Andrew-the-Less, and instigated the construction of Christ Church, Barnwell in 1839, as well as St Paul's. Perry was a "stout evangelical clergyman, equally opposed to ritualistic and rationalistic tendencies." In retirement, he was one of the founders of Ridley Hall.

According to Bray, St Paul's was a conventional district in the parish of St Andrew-the-Less from 24 October 1842, and became a new parish in its own right on 4 July 1845, when it acquired some of the parish of St Andrew the Great.

== Architecture ==
Historic England designates the church a Grade II Listed Building for these main reasons:

- "Church of 1841 by Ambrose Poynter, with later additions."
- "Historically significant as one of the new churches harshly criticised in the first issue of the Ecclesiologist, an important publication of the Gothic Revival but which possesses visual interest in its own right."
- "The interior, in spite of reordering and change, retains spatial interest and some fixtures of note, particularly stained glass windows, and Temple Moore's work of the 1890s."

The nave and west tower were built in 1841 at cost of £5766 paid by the Ecclesiastical Commissioners, to designs of Ambrose Poynter. Poynter designed two other churches in Cambridge: Christ Church Cambridge (1839) and St Andrew the Great (1842–43).

Poynter's original "design was vilified in the first issue of the Ecclesiologist by the Cambridge Camden Society in November 1841, for its lack of a chancel, for the use of brick instead of stone, and for the unornamented, late C16 or early C17 style." The Cambridge Camden Society was established in 1839 for the study of "ecclesiastical antiquities". The committee of the society published The Ecclesiologist from 1841 to 1868, arguing that architects should adopt a religious stance in their work. The design was criticised because its "style of architecture and plan of internal arrangement should have been after some approved ancient model." The following quotation (from the second edition of 1843) gives a taste of the article.

But there are many arrangements and details in this church which are on every other ground quite indefensible, even on the ground of cheapness. Such are the huge clock; the disproportionate octagonal Turrets; the great four-centered Belfry windows without cusping or mouldings; the figures 1 8 4 1 in the spandrils of the clock; the square clerestory-windows; the enormous windows in the Aisles; the mullions made to stand on the same plane as the wall; the square heads; the want of foliation; the jambs without mouldings; the graduated parapet of the Nave; the thin mullions and tracery of the east windows, the difference between the supports of the western and the other galleries; the startling contrast of the red brick and the white quoins of dressed ashlar; the trellis-work of black bricks; and many other things which time forbids us to notice.

The critique in the second edition is toned down, however, following objections from senior church leaders to the first edition. Still, Augustus Pugin reprinted the original in his Present State of Ecclesiastical Architecture (1842–43), and suggested it be circulated as a warning Beware of the Camden, to be "hung up in terrorem in every church-competing architect's office".

The chancel and vestry are additions of 1864, perhaps by H. G. Elborne. North and south transepts are additions to the nave in 1893, to designs of Temple Moore.

The interior became a multi-use space in 1996, designed by Freeland Rees-Roberts. Meeting rooms and porch were added 2012–13.

The building features these stained glass windows:

- East window 'Conversion of St Paul', by Alfred Wilkinson, 1960
- Chancel North window, after Holman Hunt, by Heaton, Butler and Bayne, 1906
- South transept East window, by Heaton, Butler and Bayne, 1920

The former parsonage, built in St Paul's Road behind the church 1853–4, was designed by George Gilbert Scott for the then vicar, his brother, John Scott; it is now the Cambridge Muslim College.

== Today ==
Imogen Nay was collated as Vicar of St Paul’s on Thursday, 1 September 2022. She was ordained priest by the Bishop of Kingston in St Andrew's Church, Surbiton, on Petertide, 4 July 2010. She served as Rector of St Andrew's Church, Rugby, and as Canon for Evangelism and Discipleship of Chelmsford Cathedral.

Until 30 September 2021, the Vicar was Michael Beckett. He is the author of Gospel in Esther, a typological reading of the Book of Esther. The book is based on a series of sermons, in which Beckett interprets Esther herself as a female exemplar of Christ. In a foreword to the book, Stephen Sykes, a former Bishop of Ely, describes St Paul's as a "parish church long noted for its attentiveness to the work of preaching". Beckett also wrote the book Authentic Church, a reflection on his experience at St Paul's.

Jon Canessa was Associate Priest until August 2021, when he was appointed as Lantern Initiative Lead at Newcastle Cathedral. He studied at Ridley Hall and completed training for ordination at Westcott House. Alongside his role as Associate Priest, he was the Bishop's Officer for Homelessness and chaired the Cambridge Churches Homeless Project.

In September 2021, St Paul's hosted a four-day arts festival, ArtsFest 2021.

Since November 2025, the church hosts Fairbite, a social supermarket and cafe, one of six across Cambridge. People attend for hot drinks and games, and those in need can buy subsidised food. Emma Caroe, the church's community development worker, said there is "massive" demand for Fairbite.

== List of Responsible Clergy ==
The following list of clergy responsible for the parish is extracted from the record of all clergy of the Diocese of Ely compiled by Gerald Bray. Following Bray's scheme, an "R" beside the date of termination means that the clergy resigned, retired or removed to another parish. Bray also documents all the curates who have served at St Paul's.

From	Perpetual Curate	To	Notes
1842/10/24	Charles Perry	1847/05/14	R Curate in charge from 1842/10/24; then Perpetual Curate from 1845/01/02. Afterwards first Anglican Bishop of Melbourne.
1847/05/30	John Scott	1862/07/30	R Brother of George Gilbert Scott
1863/01/08	Henry Hall	1890/11/06	R

From	Vicar	To	Notes
1891/01/10	Henry Paine Stokes	1917/11/20	R
1918/01/21	Johnston Carnegie Brown	1928/09/10	R
1928/10/11	John Arthur Gibson Ainley	1937/03/04	R
1937/04/07	Gerard William Joseph Gregson	1944/06/30	R
1944/10/03	William Hooker Rowdon	1947/08/21	R
1948/04/08	Kenneth Howard Hooker	1958/05/16	R
1958/06/21	Herbert Moore Carson	1965/02/16	R Herbert Carson (1922–2003) graduated from Trinity College Dublin and was ordained in the Church of Ireland; he was Vicar of St Paul's for seven years from 1958, having been Vicar of St Michael's, Blackheath Park, London, during 1953–1958. He resigned the living of St Paul's in December 1964, and seceded from Anglicanism, because of misgivings about liturgy, Establishment, bishops, and infant baptism. Subsequently, he was baptised as a believing adult with his wife Delphine. He assisted Martyn Lloyd-Jones at Westminster Chapel London, before becoming minister of Hamilton Road Baptist Church, Bangor, in 1967. He was chairman of Evangelical Press, Darlington, during the 1970s. In 1982, he moved to become minister of Knighton Evangelical Free Church, Leicester, and retired in 1988.
1965/06/21	John Gwyn Joseph Gwyn-Thomas	1977/11/21	
1978/09/19	Michael Robert Wedlake Farrer	1992/07/31	R Rural Dean of Cambridge (1984–89); Honorary Canon of Ely Cathedral (1988–92); subsequently Senior Chaplain to the Bishop of Ely (1992–95).
1993/03/02	Michael Shaun Beckett		Priest in charge from 1993/03/02; then Vicar from 1994/09/11.

== See also ==
- List of churches in Cambridge
- List of church restorations and alterations by Temple Moore
