= List of churches in Cambridge =

The following is a list of churches in Cambridge, England.

Cambridge had sixteen medieval parish churches: All Saints by the Castle, All Saints by the Jewry, St Andrew the Great, St Andrew the Less, St Bene't, St Botolph, St Clement, St Edward, St Giles, St John Zachary, St Mary, St Michael, St Peter by the Castle, St Peter outside Trumpington Gates (later renamed St Mary the Less), St Radegund?, Holy Sepulchre and Holy Trinity. Three of these have been demolished, while a further four remain standing but do not hold regular services. The other nine (StAG, St Bene't, St Botolph, St Clement, St Edward, St Giles, St Mary the Great, St Mary the Less, Holy Trinity) are still in operation, a high rate of survival attributable partly to the presence of the university and the resultant preponderance of both clergy and money.

The growth of the town in the 19th and 20th centuries necessitated the building of further Anglican churches, in addition to the medieval parish churches of Chesterton (St Andrew's), Cherry Hinton (St Andrew's), and Trumpington (SS Mary & Michael's) which were swallowed up by the urban sprawl: Christ Church (1839), St Paul's (1841), St Luke's (1863), St Matthew's (1866), St Barnabas' (1869), St Mark's (1870), St Philip's (1891), St John the Evangelist's (1896), St Augustine's (1898), St Martin's (1932), St George's (1938), St Stephen's (1940s), Holy Cross (C20th), St James's (1955), Good Shepherd (1958), St Thomas's (1980) and St John's Orchard Park (2013). In addition All Saints' Church (formerly All Saints by the Jewry) was resited and rebuilt in 1863. St Stephen's has closed, as has the resited All Saints, but the others are still active. There was also a mission chapel of St John's, Wellington Street, from 1874 until the 1940s.

== Active churches and chapels, other than college and school chapels ==
Name	Image	Refs	Dedication	Founded	Denomination	Location	Notes
Christ Church			Jesus	1837-1839	Church of England	52.2078°N 0.1332°E	Received a church graft from St Andrew the Great 2004
Christ the Redeemer			Jesus		Church of England/ Methodist	52.2119°N 0.1647°E	2004 merger of Meadowlands Methodist Church (founded in or before 1953) and Holy Cross, Fen Ditton
The Good Shepherd			Jesus	1958	Church of England	52.2254°N 0.1264°E	
Holy Trinity			Trinity	1189	Church of England	52.2059°N 0.1203°E	
St Andrew's, Cherry Hinton			Andrew	c. 1200	Church of England	52.1919°N 0.1781°E	
St Andrew's, Chesterton			Andrew	c. 1200	Church of England	52.2154°N 0.1397°E	
St Andrew the Great			Andrew	Medieval	Church of England	52.205°N 0.1217°E	Medieval church demolished 1842, rebuilt in Victorian style. Redundant 1984; home to the congregation of Holy Sepulchre since 1994.
St Augustine of Canterbury			Augustine of Canterbury		Church of England	52.2198°N 0.1077°E	Forms the Parish of the Ascension with St Giles's and St Peter's. Member of the 'Church at Castle' partnership
St Barnabas			Barnabas	1869	Church of England	52.1996°N 0.1377°E	
St Bene't's			Benedict of Nursia	c. 1020	Church of England	52.2037°N 0.1183°E	Oldest church in Cambridgeshire as well as the oldest building in Cambridge.
St Botolph's			Botwulf of Thorney	c. 1350	Church of England	52.2025°N 0.1181°E	
St Clement's			?	c. 1225	Church of England	52.2091°N 0.118°E	
St Edward King and Martyr			Edward the Martyr	c. 1250	Church of England	52.2046°N 0.1186°E	Rebuilt 1400. Royal Peculiar
St Giles'			Giles	1092	Church of England	52.2111°N 0.1148°E	Forms the Parish of the Ascension with St Augustine's and St Peter's. Member of 'Church at Castle' partnership
St George			George	1938	Church of England	52.2243°N 0.1425°E	
St James			James	1955	Church of England	52.1818°N 0.1522°E	
The Church of Jesus Christ of Latter-day Saints			Jesus	1965	The Church of Jesus Christ of Latter-day Saints	52.1840°N 0.1694°E	
St John the Evangelist			John the Evangelist	1891	Church of England	52.1853°N 0.1390°E	
St Luke's			Luke	1863	URC / CoE	52.2158°N 0.1163°E	Current structure erected 1873-1874. Local ecumenical partnership. Member of the 'Church at Castle' partnership
St Mark's			Mark	1870	Church of England	52.1964°N 0.1082°E	Smaller wooden structure on site of current building in use until 1901
St Martin's			Martin of Tours	1932	Church of England	52.1931°N 0.1503°E	Services took place in temporary structures on the site of the current building until 1961
St Mary the Great			Mary	1205	Church of England	52.2053°N 0.1182°E	
St Mary the Less			Mary	1352	Church of England	52.2011°N 0.1181°E	
SS Mary and Michael			Mary & Michael	1200-1330	Church of England	52.1739°N 0.1085°E	
St Matthew's			Matthew	1866	Church of England	52.2056°N 0.1380°E	Received a church graft from St Andrew the Great 2008
St Paul's			Paul	1841	Church of England	52.1976°N 0.1294°E	
St Philip's			Philip	1889	Church of England	52.1976°N 0.1459°E	
St Thomas's Hall			Thomas	1980	Church of England	52.1918°N 0.1569°E	Part of St Martin's parish; used regularly for services
Our Lady and the English Martyrs			Mary & Forty Martyrs	1885-1890	Catholic Church	52.1988°N 0.1273°E	
St Laurence's			Lawrence of Rome	1947	Catholic Church	52.2181°N 0.1296°E	Permanent structure built 1958
St Philip Howard			Philip Howard	1978	Catholic Church	52.1859°N 0.1606°E	
St Vincent de Paul			Vincent de Paul	1958	Catholic Church	52.2150°N 0.1679°E	Parish of Our Lady and the English Martyrs. Current building was old St Laurence's until 1958 when it was moved to Ditton Lane.
Fisher House University Catholic Chaplaincy			John Fisher	1925	Catholic Church	52.2046°N 0.1199°E	
St Athanasios			Athanasius of Alexandria	1902	Greek Orthodox	52.1878°N 0.1445°E	Ecumenical Patriarchate of Constantinople, the building was formerly the Cherry Hinton Road United Reformed Church
Arbury Road Baptist Church				1842	Baptist Union	52.2217°N 0.1336°E	Originally called the Ebenezer. Moved to current site 1930. New chapel built 1966.
Barnwell Baptist Church					Baptist Union	52.2162°N 0.1628°E	
Cherry Hinton Baptist Church					Baptist Union	52.1885°N 0.1760°E	
Mill Road Baptist Church				1881	Baptist Union	52.1978°N 0.1432°E	
St Andrew's Street Baptist Church				1721	Baptist Union	52.2027°N 0.1239°E	Rebuilt 1836, 1903
Zion Baptist Church			Zion	1837	Baptist Union	52.2035°N 0.1325°E	Rebuilt 1879
Eden Baptist Church			Eden	1823	FIEC	52.2069°N 0.1295°E	Originally a Strict and Particular Baptist chapel. Rebuilt 1874, 1982
Castle Street Methodist Church				1823	Methodist Church	52.2115°N 0.1136°E	Member of the 'Church at Castle' partnership. Built as a Primitive Methodist church; rebuilt 1841, 1863, 1914.
Chesterton Methodist Church					Methodist Church	52.2207°N 0.1456°E	
Wesley Methodist Church			John Wesley	1913	Methodist Church	52.2073°N 0.1269°E	
Downing Place United Reformed Church				1687	United Reformed	52.2032°N 0.1227°E	Founded from a merger of Emmanuel (1687) and St Columba's (c.1891); building dates from 1891
Jesus Lane Quaker Meeting House				1776–7, 1884	Religious Society of Friends of Britain Yearly Meeting	52.2084°N 0.1201°E	Originally found a meeting house in 1777, discontinued as meeting house in 1795, and then reused as a meeting in 1884.
Hartington Grove Quaker Meeting House				1983	Religious Society of Friends of Britain Yearly Meeting	52.1874°N 0.1442°E	
German Lutheran Church					?	52.1906°N 0.1309°E	Aligned with the Protestant Church in Germany (EKD)
Cambridge Salvation Army				1914	Salvation Army	52.1998°N 0.1368°E	
Cambridge Seventh-Day Adventist Church				1920	Seventh-day Adventist Church	52.1959°N 0.1525°E	Permanent building 1962
North Arbury Chapel				1976	Partnership UK	52.2308°N 0.1295°E	
Roseford Chapel				1959	?	52.2258°N 0.1167°E	
Queen Edith Chapel				c. 1960	Partnership UK	52.1814°N 0.1529°E	
King's Church Cambridge					Assemblies of God	52.1986°N 0.1361°E	Building originally Tenison Road Baptist Chapel (opened 1897). Previously Living Waters Church.
C3 Church				c. 2015	?	52.2005°N 0.1570°E	Formerly Cambridge Community Church. New church built on the site of St Stephen's Church, previously used the Free Church in Trumpington.
Memorial Unitarian Church				1904	Unitarian Church	52.2051°N 0.1261°E	Permanent building 1927, designed by Ronald Potter Jones
Cambridge Chinese Christian Church					Interdenominational	52.2117°N 0.1124°E	Castle End Mission (URC) until 2014. Built 1884
Christadelphian Hall				1954	Christadelphian	52.2018°N 0.1525°E	
City of David Church				2005	Redeemed Christian Church of God, Pentecostal	52.1875°N 0.155°E	Worship Centre located on Cherry Hinton Road
First Church of Christ Scientist					Christian Science	52.1957°N 0.1248°E	The building shows the date 1866
Kingdom Hall					Jehovah's Witnesses	52.2127°N 0.1472°E	

== College and school chapels ==
Name	Image	Refs	Dedication	Founded	Denomination	Location	Notes
King's College Chapel			Mary & Nicholas	1446-1515	Church of England	52.2048°N 0.1165°E	
Queens' College Chapel			Margaret the Virgin & Bernard of Clairvaux	1450s	Church of England	52.2029°N 0.1159°E	Rebuilt in a different part of the college 1891
Christ's College Chapel				c. 1440	Church of England	52.2057°N 0.1221°E	Enlarged and reconsecrated 1510 when God's-house was refounded as Christ's
Chapel at Churchill College				1967	Interdenominational	52.2142°N 0.0970°E	
Clare College Chapel			Mary	1363	Church of England	52.2053°N 0.1158°E	Rebuilt 1535. Current structure was built in 1763-1769
Corpus Christi College Chapel				1577	Church of England	52.2030°N 0.1187°E	Previously the college used the nearby St Bene't's church. New chapel built 1827 by William Wilkins
Downing College Chapel				1950–1953	Church of England	52.2012°N 0.1233°E	The college spent over 150 years attempting to obtain a purpose-built chapel
Emmanuel College Chapel				c. 1590	Church of England	52.2039°N 0.1245°E	Original chapel (previously dining hall of Dominican friary) became library. Current Christopher Wren structure 1677.
Fitzwilliam College Chapel				1991	Interdenominational	52.2150°N 0.1055°E	
Girton College Chapel				1899–1902	Church of England	52.2281°N 0.0843°E	
Gonville and Caius College Chapel				1393	Church of England	52.2060°N 0.1172°E	Oldest college chapel in either Oxford or Cambridge which has been in continuous use as such
Jesus College Chapel				1157–1245	Church of England	52.2090°N 0.1242°E	Oldest university building in Cambridge still in use. Previously chapel of St Radegund's Priory until college was founded c. 1500
Magdalene College Chapel				1470–1472	Church of England	52.2105°N 0.1162°E	
Pembroke College Chapel				c. 1350	Church of England	52.20155°N 0.1187°E	Original chapel (first bespoke college chapel in town) now Old Library; current chapel designed by Christopher Wren consecrated 1665
Peterhouse Chapel				1628	Church of England	52.2010°N 0.1187°E	College previously employed St Mary the Less as its chapel
Robinson College Chapel				1981	Interdenominational	52.2047°N 0.1055°E	
St Catharine's College Chapel				pre-1704	Church of England	52.20315°N 0.1169°E	Rebuilt and reconsecrated 1704
St Edmund's College Chapel				1916	Catholic Church	52.2130°N 0.1087°E	
St John's College Chapel				c. 1300	Church of England	52.2082°N 0.1178°E	Current structure constructed 1866-1869, designed by Sir George Gilbert Scott. Tallest structure in Cambridge
Selwyn College Chapel				1895	Church of England	52.20095°N 0.1068°E	
Sidney Sussex College Chapel				c. 1600	Church of England	52.2069°N 0.1208°E	Previously a friary building; rebuilt 1776
Trinity College Chapel				1554–1567	Church of England	52.2074°N 0.1175°E	
Trinity Hall Chapel				1366	Church of England	52.2056°N 0.1157°E	
Memorial Chapel, The Leys School				1905	Methodist	52.1968°N 0.1214°E	
Ridley Hall Chapel				After 1891	Church of England	52.2003°N 0.1110°E	
Wesley House Chapel				1930	Methodist	52.2088°N 0.1222°E	
Westcott House Chapel					Church of England	52.20785°N 0.1228°E	
Westminster College Chapel				1897–1899	United Reformed	52.2107°N 0.1123°E	
Westfield House Chapel			Titus		Evangelical Lutheran Church of England	52.2152°N 0.1095°E	Used by the local Lutheran congregation, Resurrection Lutheran Church

== Disused churches ==
Name	Image	Refs	Founded	Defunct	Denomination	Location	Notes
Michaelhouse			1324	1908	Church of England	52.2060°N 0.1183°E	Combined with parish of St Mary the Great 1908. Now used as a cafe with occasional services.
St Peter's			c. 1150		Church of England	52.21107°N 0.1139°E	Managed by Churches Conservation Trust. Forms the Parish of the Ascension with St Augustine's and St Giles's. Member of the 'Church at Castle' partnership with St Giles's, St Augustine's, St Luke's (C of E/URC) and Castle Street Methodist Church.
All Saints			1863	1973	Church of England	52.2082°N 0.1232°E	Previously stood opposite St John's College in what is now All Saints' Churchyard; pulled down and rebuilt in current location 1863. Redundant 1973. Not used for Anglican services; joint benefice with the Holy Sepulchre (Round Church) parish which meets in St Andrew the Great church building
Holy Sepulchre (The Round Church)			1130		Church of England	52.2084°N 0.1189°E	Managed by Christian Heritage. Now a joint benefice with St Andrew the Great, where the parish's congregation meets
Leper Chapel (Chapel of St Mary Magdalene)			c. 1125		Church of England	52.2139°N 0.1526°E	Defunct and managed by the Cambridge Preservation Society. Oldest complete surviving building in Cambridge. In a united benefice with Christ the Redeemer and used for occasional services.
St Andrew The Less			1190		Church of England	52.20895°N 0.1397°E	In a united benefice with Christ Church and rarely, if ever, used for services
Emmanuel United Reformed Church			1874	2020	United Reformed	52.2014°N 0.1182°E	Congregation merged with St Columba's to form Downing Place URC. Building now belongs to Pembroke College.
Trumpington Free Church			1899			52.1767°N 0.1145°E	Formerly used by the Cambridge Community Church (C3 Church).

== Demolished churches ==
Name	Image	Refs	Founded	Defunct	Denomination	Location	Notes
All Saints by the Castle			Perhaps before 1050	c. 1365			The parish became depopulated after the Black Death and was united with St Giles in 1365. The church became dilapidated, with its ruins still noted on a map in 1635.
St John Zachary			Before 1207	c. 1446			Parish church destroyed to make way for King's College Chapel. It was rebuilt nearby in 1458, but was last recorded in 1488, by when its parish was defunct due to houses being replaced by college buildings.
St Stephen's			1962	c. 2015	Church of England	52.2004°N 0.1572°E	Begun as St Radegund's Hall. Name St Stephen's 1948. New building dedicated 1962. Church of England church closed c. 2010. Demolished c. 2015 and replaced by the C3 Church.

== Maps ==
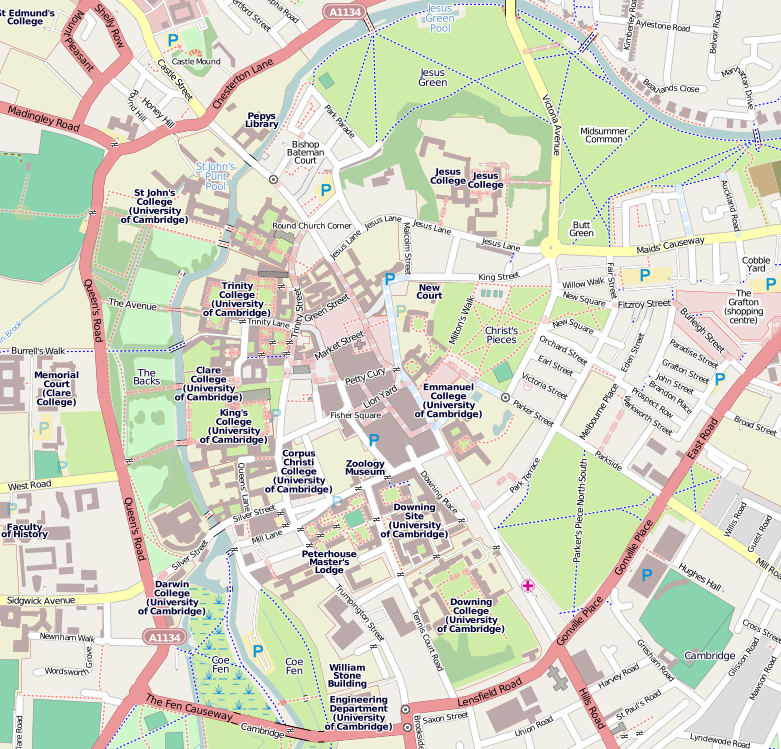
Medieval parish churches in Cambridge Central
