= Currency Commission =

The Currency Commission (Coimisiún an Airgid Reatha), was created by the Currency Act, 1927 (Section 14) as part of the policy of the Irish Free State to create the 'Saorstát pound'. The Currency Commission commissioned the Series A Banknotes, through the advice of an advisory commission. It also issued the Ploughman series of banknotes for Irish banks, which were legal tender until 1953.

The Chairman of the Currency Commission was Joseph Brennan.

On the adoption of the Constitution of Ireland in 1937 the Currency Commission of the Irish Free State became the Currency Commission of Ireland. In 1942 the Currency Commission was superseded by the Central Bank of Ireland.
