= John Whitehead (economist) =

New Zealand economist

John Whitehead CNZM GCStJ
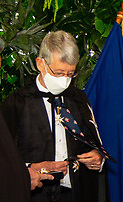
- Whitehead in 2022

Secretary to the Treasury of New Zealand
- In office 8 April 2003 – 31 May 2011
- Prime Minister: Helen Clark (2003–2008); John Key (2008–2011)
- Preceded by: Alan Bollard
- Succeeded by: Gabriel Makhlouf

Personal details
- Education: M.Com (Hons),B.Sc (Hons), University of Canterbury

John Henry Whitehead is a New Zealand economist. He served as Secretary of the New Zealand Treasury between April 2003 and May 2011. He has been chancellor and board chair of Hato Hone St John since June 2020.

== Early career ==
After completing his secondary education at Christ's College in Christchurch, New Zealand between 1965 and 1969, Whitehead went on to study at the University of Canterbury, where he graduated with a B.Sc. honours degree in Mathematics in 1970 and later completed an M.Com. degree with First Class Honours in Economics in 1975. Before joining Treasury, Whitehead was a research officer in the Statistics Department and a researcher for the Labour Party.

== Treasury ==
Whitehead joined Treasury in 1982, subsequently filling positions as Director of Macroeconomic Policy and Director of Tax Policy and International Economics. He was appointed Deputy Secretary and Branch Manager of Corporate Services in 1996.

Between 1985 and 1992, he worked as an Economic Adviser in the Prime Minister's Office and David Lange's government (1985–88), and as a Minister (Economic) at the New Zealand High Commission in London. After acting in the role, Whitehead was appointed as Treasury Secretary and chief executive on 8 April 2003 and served in that role until 31 May 2011.

In the 2011 Queen's Birthday Honours, Whitehead was appointed a Companion of the New Zealand Order of Merit (CNZM), for services as Secretary to the Treasury.

== World Bank ==
Whitehead was a World Bank Executive Director from August 2011 to July 2013 for Australia, Cambodia, Kiribati, Republic of Korea, Marshall Islands, Federated States of Micronesia, Mongolia, New Zealand, Palau, Papua New Guinea, Samoa, Solomon Islands, Tuvalu and Vanuatu.

== St John New Zealand ==
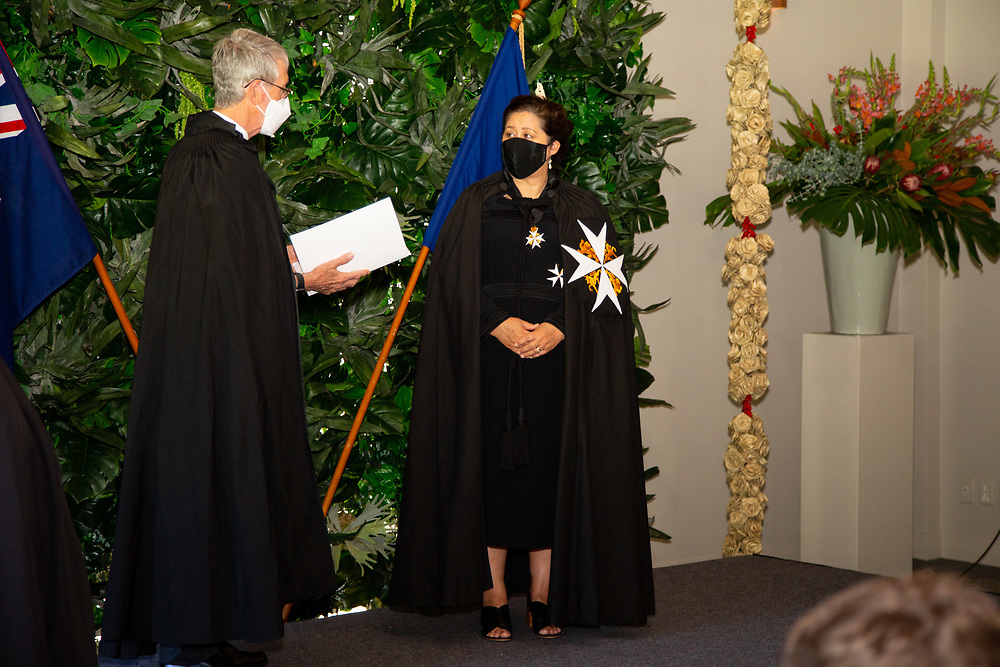
Whitehead installs Dame Cindy Kiro as prior of the Order of St John in New Zealand, at Government House, Auckland, on 17 March 2022

In 2016, Whitehead was appointed to the board of St John New Zealand. In March 2019, he was appointed as a Commander of the Order of St John (CStJ), promoted to Knight (KStJ) in February 2020, and further elevated to Bailiff Grand Cross of the same Order (GCStJ) in April 2026. He was appointed chancellor and chair of the national priory board of St John New Zealand for a three-year term from 24 June 2020.

Government offices
Preceded by Alan Bollard	Secretary to the Treasury; 2003–2011	Succeeded by Gabriel Makhlouf
