= Maurice O'Connell (banker) =

Irish banker and civil servant (died 2019)

Maurice O’Connell

Governor of the Central Bank of Ireland
- In office 24 May 1994 – 6 June 2002
- Taoiseach: Albert Reynolds; John Bruton; Bertie Ahern
- Preceded by: Maurice F. Doyle
- Succeeded by: John Hurley

Personal details
- Born: Maurice O’Connell; 5 May 1936 Moyvane, County Kerry, Ireland
- Died: 1 April 2019 (aged 82) Dublin, Ireland
- Spouse: Marjorie Treacy (m. 1964)
- Children: 4
- Education: St Michael's College, Listowel; St Brendan's College, Killarney
- Alma mater: St Patrick's College, Maynooth; University College Dublin

Maurice O’Connell (5 May 1936 – 1 April 2019) was an Irish economist who served as Governor of the Central Bank of Ireland from 1994 to 2002. He also represented Ireland on the European Central Bank Governing Council from 1999 to 2001.

O’Connell was born on the 5 May 1936, in Moyvane, County Kerry. His parents Thomas and Mary O'Connell were both teachers. He did St Michael's College Listowel, a school his grandfather taught for 50 years and was a founding member. He went on to attend St Brendan's College, Killarney. He went on to graduate from Maynooth Ecclesiastical College. He later obtained his MA in classics from University College Dublin. O’Connell just to follow in his parents' footsteps, embarked on the same career, teaching. He started teaching at International College St Gallen, Switzerland for some and he returned to Dublin, Ireland which became his living place, he joined the civil service in Dublin with much of it he spent in the Department of Finance. He served as the administrative officer in 1962 and rose to become the secretary in charge of the Finance Division. He also became a member of the European Union Monetary Committee in 1998 until the summer of 1994.

== Contribution in Irish Finance ==
During Irish pound crisis in 1992, he led a role in defending the currency making mortgage rates rise 16pc, during devaluation and international trade which Ireland battled in the unit of the money to be replaced with euro. The change over took only one week into the new currency euro and banknotes and coin were vast for transaction in the country that was in 2002. That alone makes the government extend his term in office for the transition. Only € 129.4 million in banknotes and € 970 million in coins were distributed in preparation, the Irish pound and euro in circulation had to be overseen in the first one and half months of 2002. He was among the founding governors of the European Central Bank leading role in the production of banknotes and implementing several pieces of legislation.

After retirement within some years, he was made to commission a review of the 18.7bn National Pension Reserve Fund by the government after recent market volatility.

== Personal life ==
He was married to Marjorie Treacy with four children, two sons and two daughters.
