= Financial Regulator (Ireland) =

Ireland's regulator of financial institutions, May 2003 - October 2010

- Rialtóir Airgeadais

Agency overview
- Formed: 1 May 2003
- Dissolved: 1 October 2010
- Superseding agency: Absorbed back into Central Bank of Ireland
- Jurisdiction: Ireland
- Headquarters: (Republic of Ireland) Dublin
- Agency executives: Jim Farrell, Chairman; Matthew Elderfield, Chief Executive
- Parent agency: Central Bank of Ireland
- Website: Web archive

The Financial Regulator (Irish: Rialtóir Airgeadais), officially the Irish Financial Services Regulatory Authority, was the single regulator of all financial institutions in Ireland from May 2003 until October 2010 and was a "constituent part" of the Central Bank of Ireland. It was re-unified with the Central Bank of Ireland on 1 October 2010 and its board structure was replaced by a new Central Bank of Ireland Commission.

Matthew Elderfield, formerly head of the Bermuda Monetary Authority, led the organisation from January 2010 until it was disestablished in November 2010. The previous chief executive officer was Patrick Neary, who retired early over the handling of the regulator's investigation into the €87 million in secret directors' loans at Anglo Irish Bank. The incumbent before that, had companies he is a director of, fined a total of €3.35 million by his previous employers the Financial Regulator, for risk control and reporting failures.

== History ==
=== Establishment ===
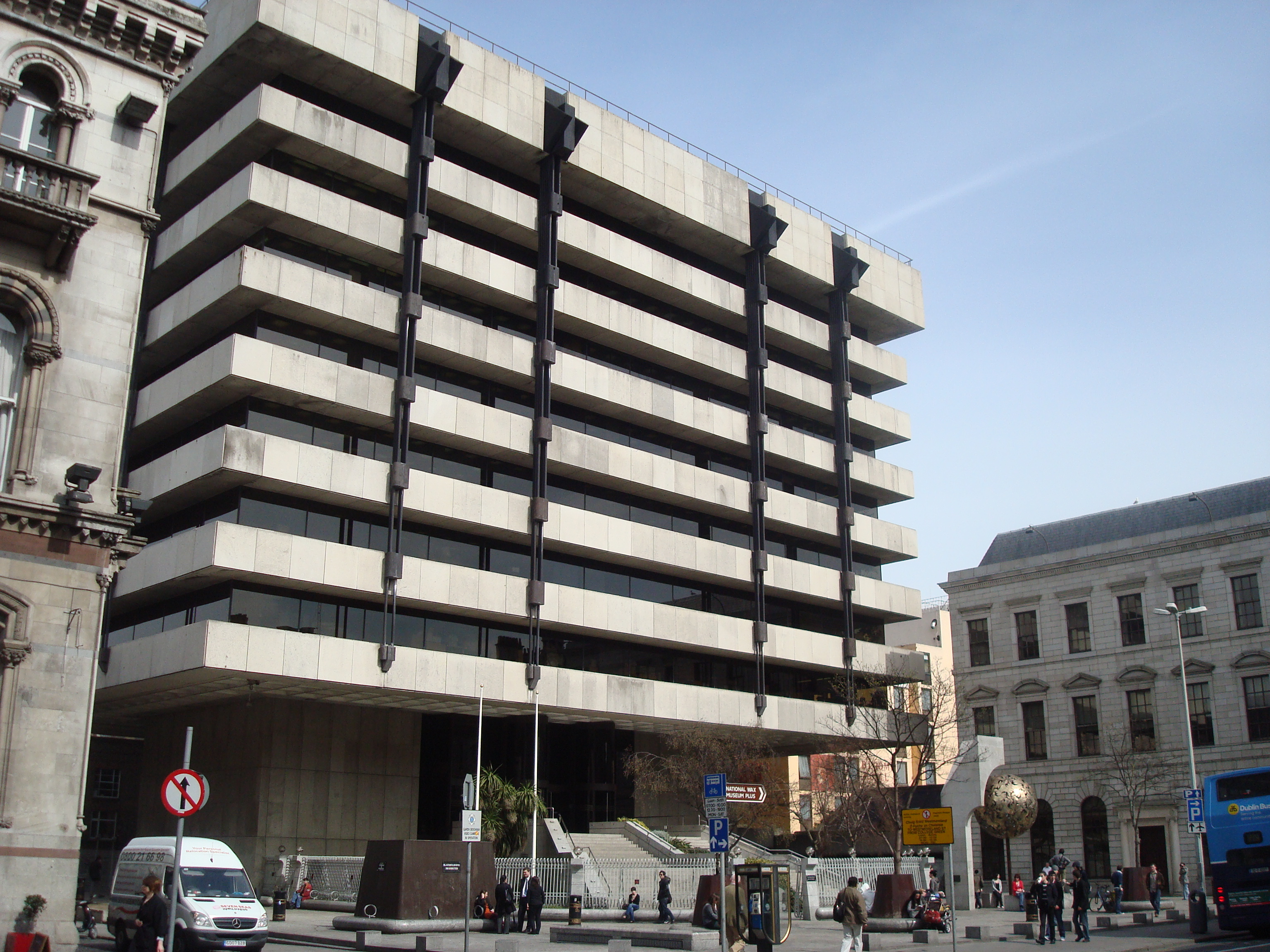
The Financial Regulators HQ in Dame Street

The regulator was established on 1 May 2003 by the Central Bank and Financial Services Authority of Ireland Act, 2003. The regulator was a distinct element of the Central Bank and Financial Services Authority of Ireland with clearly defined regulatory responsibilities which covered all Irish financial institutions, including those previously regulated by the Central Bank of Ireland, the Department of Enterprise, Tourism and Employment, the Office of the Director of Consumer Affairs and the Registrar of Friendly Societies.

One of the regulators main mandates was a role in consumer protection. It also took over the policing of the Irish Stock Exchange on 1 November 2007, assuming day-to-day responsibility for detecting and investigating market abuse. It had a headcount of 377.

=== Developments that led to its disestablishment ===
Following the failure of the then-regulatory structures to prevent excessive lending to the property sector, consultants Mazars, which were brought in to review operations said that "regulatory expertise was lacking in some areas."

Responding to the highlighted weakness, Brian Lenihan, the then Minister for Finance, said "substantial additional staff with the skills, experience and market-based expertise will be appointed. Those recruited will also have the expertise to regulate the international financial services sector." He also announced that all consumer functions will be '"reassigned"' to other agencies.

In June 2009 the government announced that a new body, called the Central Bank of Ireland Commission, would replace the then board structure of the Central Bank and the Regulator. A July 2009 editorial, in the respected Sunday Business Post, said "returning the key powers of regulation to the Central Bank will be useless unless there is a fundamental change in the culture of the organisation. This does not require a complete change of personnel, but a change of key personnel." The Irish Times, a national "newspaper of record" opined that "the Financial Regulator has a death wish and its regulatory edict verges on the Pythonesque, eating into what is left of its credibility." Staff, who worked 32.5 hours per week or 6.5 hours a day, went on strike in November 2009

== Controversy ==
=== 2004 Sachsen LB case ===
The Financial Regulator was warned by the German regulator, BaFin, as early as 2004 that Sachsen LB's troubled Irish subsidiaries were involved in highly risky and under-scrutinised transactions worth as much as €30bn or 20 times the parent bank's capitalisation. Despite the warning, in 2007 the Regulator approved another Sachsen investment vehicle and two months later the stable of off-balance sheet companies needed a €17.3bn bail-out from the German association of savings banks to keep Sachsen afloat.

=== Wild West of European finance ===
The Irish Brokers Association said there was "intense frustration and annoyance" about excessive red tape and the FR refusing to listen to them in 2005.

The same year the Regulator was criticised for publishing a report, which it was said, read a bit like a promotional brochure for the money lending industry. It included a section devoted to arguing why moneylenders should be allowed to charge as much as they do. (188%-plus collection fees of up to 11%.)

The New York Times referred to the Irish insurance industry as the "Wild West of European finance" in April 2005 which was seen to underline the fragility of the Country's Financial Regulation system.

=== Dissatisfaction with the regulator ===
The Australian Authorities warned the Financial Regulator of the activities of person connected with the largest bankruptcy in that country's history. The FR did nothing, he went on to commit a US$500 million fraud and pleaded guilty in the US despite the crime being committed in Ireland.

Their consumer panel stated that the regulator was slow to respond to consumer issues and '"appears to seek complexity and obstacles rather than to seek consumer-oriented solutions to current and emerging problems"'. And it warned that this approach can undermine consumer confidence in the "efficacy of the regulatory process. "

The same month in 2006, a government-appointed panel that consisted of banking and insurance representatives revealed widespread dissatisfaction with the regulator’s skills base.

The regulator’s industry panel, which provided the regulator with feedback on its charges and policies said the levy on financial institutions for industry funding was ‘'perceived by industry as cumbersome and bureaucratic'’ and had ‘'major concerns with the quality and cost of the services'’ provided to the regulator by the Central Bank.

They did not give their consumer panel a copy of the report of the working group set up following the collapse of a stockbrokers, where some investors were waiting over 7 years to have their claims processed. When the panel managed to get sight of it, they said it was "extremely deficient"

=== 2007 calls for an independent review ===
In July 2007, the Comptroller and Auditor General called for an independent review of the inspection process for financial institutions carried out by the Financial Regulator. The Comptroller urged the introduction of clearly defined risk categories for individual areas of financial services, so that the appropriate level of supervision required for each institution can be implemented in line with the risk involved.

Transcripts of phone calls by the Financial Regulator's senior staff suggested they gave tacit approval to the illicit movement of deposits involving Irish Life and Permanent plc. "Okay, that's grand, right I think that's everything". The regulator refused to say whether staff might face disciplinary procedures or sanctions if the transcripts were validated and investigated internally.

=== Allied Irish bank case ===
The Financial Regulator knew that Allied Irish Banks were overcharging consumers in FX fees but failed to act for a number of years. They gave a parliamentary inquiry the "false impression" that they were unaware of it. The whistleblower who gave the FR the information was requested to come to a meeting with them but was only invited to withdraw the allegations of wrongdoing and at the same time found himself removed from his position at Allied Irish Banks without any reason given. After his case was highlighted in the media, the FR officially apologised on how the authorities treated him, eight years after alerting them of overcharging.

The same whistleblower also sent a report entitled 'Special Investigation Goodbody Stockbrokers – Trading in AIB Shares' to the FR, in which questions were raised about the legality of a device used to trade in AIB shares through offshore locations in blacklisted tax havens Nevis and Vanuatu. No action was taken.

=== Deficient response from the regulator ===
The Financial Services Consultative Consumer Panel, which was tasked with monitoring the performance of the Financial Regulator, said that most consumers had lost "significant amounts of money" due to the inadequacies of the financial regulatory structure. It also criticised the "deficient" response of the regulator to threats to consumers, including the Irish property bubble. In response they said "It is clear that the actions we took were insufficient and were not taken early enough",

The Fine Gael leader Enda Kenny and finance spokesman Richard Bruton called for the board and senior management of the Financial Regulator to be sacked. Independent Senator, Shane Ross said that the FR was an institution that had lost the faith of the international markets "They think it is actually genetically flawed. That is the problem we’re going to have to attack next".

=== Ernst & Young and the bank guarantee scheme ===
Ernst & Young was hired, to advise the Financial Regulator on the €440 billion bank guarantee scheme in January 2009, despite the fact that Ernst & Young was being investigated arising from its audits of Anglo Irish Bank and had also refused to appear before a parliamentary committee following the collapse of the same bank after receiving "legal advice". The then Chief Executive of the Financial Regulator told the same committee that "a lay person would expect that issues of this nature and this magnitude would have been picked up” by the external auditors. At the same time the lowest tender was not chosen for the fit out of new offices in Spencer Dock in Dublin's docklands.

=== FR muzzles critical comments ===
In July 2009, they blocked insurers and banks from making any critical statements containing "any references to the Financial Regulator" by means either of "public press statements" or un-approved public references, whether "written or oral."

=== Credit union perpetual bond case ===
Two reports of an investigation into the "wholly inappropriate sale of perpectual bonds" by Davy Stockbrokers to credit unions failed to involve any of the credit unions affected, leaving them "in the dark and powerless to add any value to the findings of this investigation". The FR then declined to give them access to the reports. The Chairman of one of the Credit Union's who suffered large losses told his members ‘'The failure to publish the reports is to place the complaints process in a shroud of secrecy. Such a failure of openness, transparency and fairness can only serve to undermine confidence in the complaints process, forcing those with grievances into the courts. Such a course of action is not in the interest of any of the stakeholders".

They had to admit that it had issued private warnings to over 30% of credit unions about their arrears levels, but refused to provide full updates on what percentage of credit union loans are in arrears or how quickly they are increasing. This raised questions about the Financial Regulator's commitment to openness.

=== German regulators Depfa Bank criticism ===
The next month, the head of the German Financial Regulator told the Bundestag Finance Committee that the failure of the "terrible" Depfa Bank, which was completely supervised by the Irish Financial Regulator, lead to the collapse of its German parent which forced Berlin to bail it out at a cost of €102 billion. The committee was told that the alternative was a run on German banks and the eventual collapse of the European finance system and "You would have woken up on Monday morning in the film Apocalypse Now" The bank had just 319 employees but was allowed to guarantee loans valued at 14 times Ireland's Gross Domestic Product. A former Governor of the FR's parent, the Central Bank of Ireland, was a director of Depfa. Regulatory failure was acknowledged and this is a source of continuing friction with the German authorities.

=== Non transparency ===
Transparency International have questioned whether the Financial Regulator should continue to have an exemption from Freedom of Information legislation. Compliance experts have said "The most offensive confidentiality provision in Ireland is the one which protects the Financial Regulator" Both the Financial Services Ombudsman and Information Commissioner, are among others, who called for a lifting of the confidentiality applied by the regulator to much of its work. Other EU regulators have a policy of transparency.

In Autumn of the same year, they were severely criticised in a report marked "strictly confidential and not for publication", commissioned on how it operates, said they were poor value for money and had too few specialist staff, compared with its peers. There were also serious shortcomings in the crucial supervisory area. and the report was particularly critical of the regulator’s senior management structure, concluding that a clear management and oversight framework, which ensures that issues are escalated through the organisation, was "not fully in place".

=== Regret of the regulators creation ===
Former Taoiseach Bertie Ahern, in a report in the Financial Times said that his decision in 2001 to create a new financial regulator was one of the main reasons for the collapse of the Irish banking sector and "if I had a chance again I wouldn’t do it". "The banks were irresponsible," he admitted "But the Central Bank and the Financial Regulator seemed happy. They were never into us saying – ever – 'Listen, we must put legislation and control on the banks'. That never happened."

=== Regulatory failures ===
The director general of the Free Legal Advice Centres in October 2009 said, the code of conduct on mortgage arrears produced by the Financial Regulator was "deeply disappointing", and did not offer enough protection for consumers.

In a speech, the Governor of the Central Bank said that "ignorance and inattention" by FR staff were to blame for regulatory failure.

The Consumer Consultative Panel, in December 2009 said that they were unable to function for almost a year because officials ignored requests for meetings and "we believe it is unacceptable that the board of the Financial Regulator has failed to take responsibility for their stewardship of the organisation during the last six years.The FR did not understand many of the sectors and financial products it regulates. These failings undermines their ability to enhance or enforce corporate governance in the wider financial services sector.It also warned "that the reforms announced to date were not sufficient to avert more crisis' in the future."

The Financial Regulator should give an annual statement to the Dáil on bank supervision to make regulation ‘'more accountable'’, the Comptroller and Auditor General said in March 2010 after highlighting shortcomings in financial regulation leading up to the financial crisis .

The next month, the FR Chief Executive outlined his shock at the poor level of financial regulation he discovered when he started his job the previous January and "it is clear to me we need to undertake a fundamental overhaul of the regulatory model for financial services in Ireland. He also said that there was a "critical absence of intellectual firepower within his staff

At the same time the influential German newspaper Siddeutsche Zeitung described as "remarkable" the FR's handling of a whistleblower's revelations that an Irish subsidiary of a central European bank had 40 times the permitted level of deviation of minimum liquidity requirements. They also did not inform the parent bank and the relevant regulatory authority on the continent.

=== Regulator allowed poor lending practices ===
High risk and sloppy lending practices at the Irish Nationwide Building Society were reported to the Financial Regulator by external accountants over a long period but did not change its behaviour. The former head of compliance, became a whistle blower by reporting "dodgy practices" but again the authorities did nothing. It required a €5.4 billion Government bailout, leaving it effectively in State ownership. A letter which the FR received concerning the legality of the illicit loans by the Building Society to Sean FitzPatrick had "gone missing". Management at Irish Nationwide used to arrange meetings with the FR for late on a Friday afternoon, knowing that the regulator's staff would not want for the encounter to last for more than an hour because it would nibble into their weekend.

The chief executive was asked at a parliamentary committee "In regard to baseline qualifications, if your staff is regulating the financial sector, should it not be the case where they should have the bare minimum required in the market as well, a qualified financial adviser status, or they've gone through certain industry exams. It's obviously important to have." But the FR chief disagreed: "I don't agree with that. But I think I'm conflicted because I've never taken a professional exam in my life."

=== Regulators failings during the 2008 financial crisis ===
June 2010 reports on the financial crisis did not ask the opinion of their consumer consultative panel, who in a statement said it was "very disappointed that, in particular, the report by the FR's ultimate head did not refer to the work of the panel in highlighting many of the failings of the regulator in the past number of years." Fresh areas of concern included the lack of minute-taking at senior levels in the Financial Regulator and among its board. "If this is the situation that prevails, then this has to be a source of concern regarding the standard of governance."

One of the reports noted that the Financial Regulator had found substantial departures from credit policy during inspections of banks, but failed adequately to follow up on its concerns. Secondly intrusive demands from regulatory staff could be and were set aside after direct representations were made to senior regulators.

Two months later, it emerged that the FR authorised the Quinn Group (which subsequently went into administration) to borrow €169 million from Anglo Irish Bank in order to buy Anglo Irish shares (which subsequently had to be nationalised at a cost of €5,500 for every man, woman and child in the State). Its actions were described as "like the Vatican running an abortion clinic."

On her September 2010 state tour to Russia, the President of Ireland Mary McAleese, highlighting the importance of competence, launched an unprecedented attack on the Financial Regulator for their role in the financial crisis which resulted in tens of thousands of people in mortgage arrears.

The same month, it was reported that the German television station ZDF in a programme filmed in Ireland on banking said ‘'is an open secret that the rules here are not exactly strict'’.

Almost simultaneously external reviewers highlighted the "unacceptable" pace of investigation into how the financial system in Ireland came close to collapse "leaves a lot to be desired". This was contrasted with the US and Iceland, which have moved faster to examine what went wrong. "Furthermore, there has been very little outcome from ongoing investigations into dealings at some of our major institutions by the Financial Regulator".

Criminal prosecutions by the Garda Síochána against managers in banks who committed offences are being undermined as the FR were aware of the alleged offences, took no action to stop them and thus provided an arguable defence to those who committed wrongdoing, as they could reasonably claim they were acting with the approval of regulatory authorities at all times. One line of inquiry being investigated by detectives is that the FR did not inform the Department of Finance of all facts they knew about the banking industry. Two arrests were made following a complaint made by two officials in the Financial Regulator's office.

The European Commission in a November 2010 review of the financial crisis said "Some national supervisory authorities failed dramatically. We know that in Ireland there was almost no supervision of the large banks".

=== Davy Stockbrokers case ===
Five years elapsed before the FR forced Davy Stockbrokers to inform investors, who lost tens of millions of Euro, that ‘'the instrument sold was not compliant with the Trustees (Authorised Investments) Order at the time of its sale as it was not listed on a recognised Stock Exchange'’ and it "dealt as principal in both the purchase and sale and was in breach of the rules of the Irish Stock Exchange by not disclosing this fact on its contract note'’. The effected parties had settled their claim against the stockbroker, before receiving the notification, and it was suggested they could have received much more compensation if the FR had ensured that their adverse findings about the case was communicated. The full report was not published and no regulatory action was taken.

=== International Monetary fund review ===
Within days, after the arrival in Ireland of the International Monetary Fund, they admitted that the stress tests on banks, that the FR conducted 4 months earlier "failed to convince financial markets" and the level of capital that the banks needed which they recently described as at "shock and awe" safety levels would be increased by 50 per cent.

== See also ==
- Anglo Irish Bank
- Put on the green jersey
