= Gabriel Makhlouf =

Governor of Central Bank of Ireland

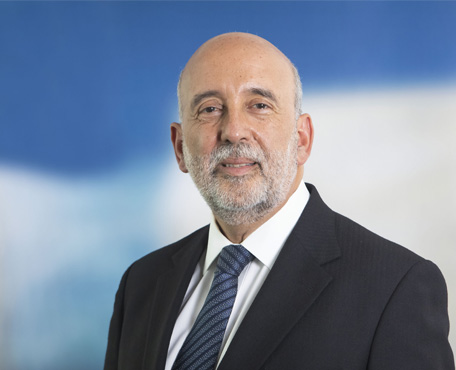

Governor of the Central Bank of Ireland
- Incumbent
- Assumed office 1 September 2019
- Taoiseach: Leo Varadkar; Micheál Martin; Simon Harris
- Preceded by: Philip R. Lane (Permanent); Sharon Donnery (Acting)

New Zealand Treasury Secretary and Chief Executive
- In office June 2011 – June 2019
- Preceded by: John Whitehead
- Succeeded by: Caralee McLiesh

Personal details
- Born: 1960 (age 65–66) Egypt
- Education: University of Exeter; University of Bath

Gabriel Makhlouf (born 1960) is a British public servant and policymaker who has served as the governor of the Central Bank of Ireland since September 2019. He was previously secretary to the New Zealand Treasury and private secretary to then British chancellor of the exchequer, Gordon Brown.

He was appointed to the Central Bank after an open international competition led to him being the only name put forward to the Government of Ireland for appointment. However, his appointment has not been uncontroversial due to an incident in New Zealand when he claimed the disclosure of sensitive information was the result of a deliberate hack, when the information had actually been disclosed accidentally. In July 2019, The Irish Times reported that the European Central Bank had raised concerns with the Irish government about Makhlouf. These reportedly included that he was not an economist and that he is a British citizen.

Gabriel Makhlouf was born in 1960 in Cairo, Egypt to a Cypriot-British father and Greek-Armenian mother.

In March 2026, the Irish government nominated Makhlouf for a second 7 years term as governor of the central bank of Ireland, which will start in September 2026 and last until 2033.

== Notes ==
Government offices
Preceded by John Whitehead	Secretary of the New Zealand Treasury; 2011–2019	Succeeded by Caralee McLiesh
Preceded by Philip R. Lane (permanent); Sharon Donnery (acting)	Governor of the Central Bank of Ireland; 2019–present	Incumbent
