= Philip R. Lane =

Irish economist (born 1969)

Philip Lane

Chief Economist of the European Central Bank
- Incumbent
- Assumed office 1 June 2019
- President: Mario Draghi; Christine Lagarde
- Preceded by: Peter Praet

Member of the Executive Board of the European Central Bank
- Incumbent
- Assumed office 1 June 2019
- Preceded by: Peter Praet

Governor of the Central Bank of Ireland
- In office 3 November 2015 – 1 June 2019
- Taoiseach: Enda Kenny; Leo Varadkar
- Preceded by: Patrick Honohan
- Succeeded by: Gabriel Makhlouf

Personal details
- Born: Philip Richard Lane; 27 August 1969 (age 56) Dublin, Ireland
- Spouse: Órla Lane (m. 1996)
- Children: 2
- Education: Blackrock College; Trinity College Dublin; Harvard University
- Website: Official website

Philip Richard Lane (born 27 August 1969) is an Irish economist who has been serving as a member of the Executive Board of the European Central Bank since 2019 and concurrently as ECB chief economist. He previously served as Governor of the Central Bank of Ireland from 2015 to 2019. As ECB Chief Economist, Lane is seen by many as providing an academic counterweight to the traditional political abilities of ECB President, Christine Lagarde.

== Career ==
He was the professor of international macroeconomics and Director of the Institute for International Integration Studies (IIIS) at Trinity College Dublin. He studied at Trinity College Dublin and was elected a scholar in Economic and Social Studies there, before receiving a doctorate in Economics at Harvard University in 1995. He then became Assistant Professor of Economics and International Affairs at Columbia University during 1995–1997, before returning to Trinity College, Dublin in 1997. He remains affiliated with Trinity College as Whatley Professor of Political Economy (on leave). He was a research fellow of the Centre for Economic Policy Research and had been a visiting scholar at the International Monetary Fund and the Federal Reserve Bank of New York and a consultant to the European Commission. He is among the "Top 10% of Economists in the World" according to IDEAS/RePEc.

His research interests include international economics, economic growth, European Monetary Union and Irish economic performance. He is best known for his work on the voracity effect, by which a positive shock perversely reduces economic growth through more-than-proportionate fiscal redistribution, and for his measurements of the stocks of foreign assets.

He has also chaired the Advisory Scientific Committee of the European Systemic Risk Board and was Director of the International Macroeconomics and Finance Programme at CEPR. He has also acted as an academic consultant for the European Central Bank, World Bank, OECD, Asian Development Bank and a number of national central banks. In September 2016, he was appointed as chair of the ESRB High-Level Task Force on Safe Assets.

== Governor of the Central Bank of Ireland ==
Lane appeared regularly in the media prior to his appointment as Governor of the Central Bank of Ireland. The Central Bank of Ireland's reputation was badly damaged in the Irish financial crisis. Lane has taken actions to address some of the main criticisms (e.g. explicit mortgage controls and the new modified gross national income metric), there is evidence other issues remain (e.g. commercial property bubbles, and light-touch regulation), and that new controls, such as mortgage limits, are being circumvented by Irish banks, and the Irish State itself.

== Other activities ==
As Governor of the Central Bank of Ireland, Lane was an Ex-Officio Alternate Member of the Board of Governors of the International Monetary Fund (IMF)

Government offices
Preceded by Patrick Honohan	Governor of the Central Bank of Ireland; 2015–2019	Succeeded by Gabriel Makhlouf
Preceded by Peter Praet	Member of the Executive Board of the European Central Bank; 2019–present	Incumbent
Preceded by Peter Praet	Chief Economist of the European Central Bank; 2019–present	Incumbent
