= Patrick Honohan =

Irish economist and public servant

Governor of the Central Bank of Ireland
- In office 26 September 2009 – 25 November 2015
- Taoiseach: Brian Cowen; Enda Kenny
- Preceded by: John Hurley
- Succeeded by: Philip R. Lane

Personal details
- Born: Patrick Honohan; 9 October 1949 (age 77) Dublin, Ireland
- Spouse: Iseult Lawlor (m. 1971)
- Children: 1
- Education: University College Dublin; London School of Economics

Patrick Honohan (born 9 October 1949) is an Irish economist and public servant who served as the Governor of the Central Bank of Ireland from 2009 to 2015 (and as such was a member of the Governing Council of the European Central Bank). He has been a nonresident senior fellow at the Peterson Institute for International Economics since 2016.

His period in office as Governor was mainly focused on resolving the Post-2008 Irish banking crisis.

== Education ==
Honohan graduated with a B.A. in Economics and Mathematics from University College Dublin in 1971 and an M.A. in Economics from the same institution in 1973. His postgraduate study continued at the London School of Economics where he received an M.Sc. in Econometrics and Mathematical Economics (1974) and a PhD in Economics (1978).

== Professional career ==
Before pursuing postgraduate research, Honohan took a position with the International Monetary Fund in 1971. While completing his PhD, he joined the economics staff of the Central Bank of Ireland. During the Irish fiscal crisis of the 1980s, he was Economic Advisor to Taoiseach Garret FitzGerald, working on issues as diverse as income tax and social welfare, restructuring of failing state-owned enterprises, legislative reform for building societies, the governance of national statistics provision, and the devaluation of the Irish pound in August 1986.

Honohan spent seven years as a Research Professor with the Economic and Social Research Institute before returning in 1998 to the World Bank (where he had worked between 1987 and 1990) as a Lead Economist and subsequently Senior Advisor. At the World Bank he published research on financial sector issues, drawing on policy advice and analysis in a wide range of emerging and developing economies from China and Viet Nam to Egypt, Iran and Tanzania, among others, as well as in the CFA franc, Rand and Eastern Caribbean currency unions. He was involved in the design and development of the joint World Bank-IMF Financial Sector Assessment Program (FSAP), and led several FSAP missions including the first (Lebanon, 1999).

The author of numerous academic papers and monographs, Honohan has taught economics at the LSE, University of California, San Diego, the Australian National University and University College Dublin. In 2007, he was appointed Professor of International Financial Economics and Development at Trinity College, Dublin and elected to professorial fellowship in 2008. He later became an honorary professor of economics at Trinity College Dublin and was elected a member of the Royal Irish Academy in 2002.

His academic work has focused on such topics as the prevention and management of banking crises, financial liberalization, dollarization, and the impact on poverty in developing countries of expanding access to financial services. His analysis of the link between Irish and UK labour markets and the distorting impact of the activities of multinational corporations on Irish macro-economic statistics also received attention.

In September 2009, Honohan was appointed as the tenth governor of the Central Bank of Ireland. In this position he acquired a reputation as a "straight talker" who would not follow the "green jersey agenda" (a major criticism of the Central Bank of Ireland pre-crisis, see criticisms of the Irish Central Bank). His May 2010 Report on the Irish Banking Crisis provided an in-depth analysis of the regulatory and supervisory shortcomings that had contributed to the post-2008 Irish Banking Crisis. The turnaround in the Central Bank's international reputation during his tenure was cemented in January 2016 when it won "Central Bank of the Year" in the awards announced by CentralBanking.com.

His role in management of the Irish banking and fiscal crisis, entailing extensive provision of central bank liquidity, recapitalization — at the expense of their shareholders — of all of the banks (and the liquidation of some), and a restructuring of unsustainable debts, all of which required financial support from the IMF, European Union funds and the European Central Bank, is described in his 2019 volume Currency, Credit and Crisis.

== Quotations ==
Since his retirement from the Central Bank of Ireland, Honohan has been critical of the level of distortion that U.S. multinational BEPS tools have been having on Ireland's national accounts. Distortion of economic data is a common problem for corporate tax havens and Ireland is considered one of the world's largest havens. During the famous leprechaun economics affair, he made the following comment:

The statistical distortions created by the impact on the Irish National Accounts of the global assets and activities of a handful of large multinational corporations have now become so large as to make a mockery of conventional uses of Irish GDP.

— Patrick Honohan, ex-Governor of the Central Bank of Ireland, 13 July 2016

He has said the following about credit booms:

The tax revenue generated by the boom came in many forms: capital gains on property, stamp duty on property transactions, value added tax on construction materials and income tax from the extra workers – immigrants from the rest of Europe, from Africa, from China, flooded in as the construction sector alone swelled up to account for about 13 per cent of the numbers at work ...

== Other activities ==
- European Central Bank (ECB), Chair of the Ethics Committee (2019–22)

== See also ==
- Irish property bubble
- Post-2008 Irish economic downturn
- National Asset Management Agency
- Ireland as a tax haven

Government offices
| Preceded by John Hurley | Governor of the Central Bank of Ireland; 2009–2015 | Succeeded by Philip R. Lane |
