= Central Bank of Ireland =

Irish monetary authority

Coordinates: 53.3477°N 6.2349°W

Central Bank of Ireland Banc Ceannais na hÉireann

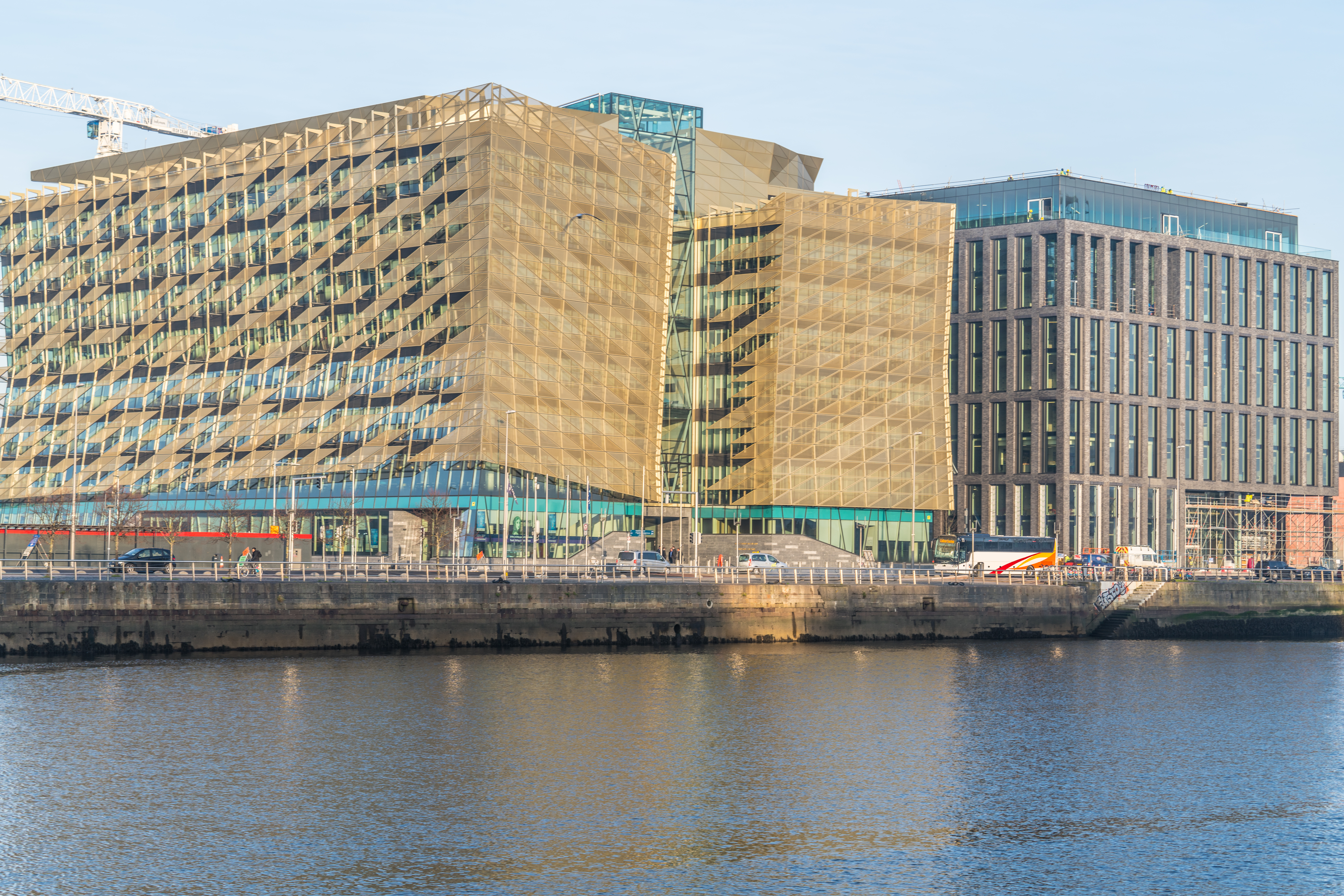
- Central bank of: Ireland
- Headquarters: New Wapping Street; North Wall Quay; Dublin; Ireland
- Established: 1 February 1943; 83 years ago
- Ownership: 100% state ownership
- Governor: Gabriel Makhlouf (since September 2019)
- Reserves: 0.74 billion USD (2017)
- Preceded by: Currency Commission (currency control); Bank of Ireland (Government's banker)^{1}
- Website: centralbank.ie
- ^{1} Even after establishment of the Central Bank, the Bank of Ireland remained the government's banker until 1 January 1972.^{2} The Central Bank of Ireland still exists but many functions have been taken over by the ECB.

The Central Bank of Ireland (Irish: Banc Ceannais na hÉireann) is the national central bank for Ireland within the Eurosystem. From 1943 to 1998, it was the monetary authority responsible for issuing and controlling the Irish pound. It is also the country's primary financial supervisory authority.

The Central Bank of Ireland was founded on 1 February 1943, succeeding the Currency Commission of Ireland, a currency board established in 1922. Since 1 January 1972, it has operated under the Central Bank Act 1971, which completed the transition from the strict post-independence currency peg to the pound sterling to a fully autonomous central bank.

In addition to its monetary role, the Central Bank is also a financial supervisory authority. In that capacity, it increasingly implements policies set at the European Union level. It is the national competent authority for Ireland within European Banking Supervision. It is a voting member of the respective Boards of Supervisors of the European Banking Authority (EBA), European Insurance and Occupational Pensions Authority (EIOPA), and European Securities and Markets Authority (ESMA). It is Ireland's designated National Resolution Authority and plenary session member of the Single Resolution Board (SRB). It provides the permanent single common representative for Ireland in the Supervisory composition of the General Board of the Anti-Money Laundering Authority (AMLA). It is also a member of the European Systemic Risk Board (ESRB).

== History ==
=== From Currency Commission to Central Bank (1920–1942) ===
On the independence of the Irish Free State in 1922, the new state's trade was overwhelmingly with the United Kingdom (98% of Irish exports and 80% of imports in 1924), so the introduction of an independent currency was a low priority. British banknotes (British Treasury notes, Bank of England notes), and notes issued by Irish trading banks circulated (but only the first were legal tender) and British coins remained in circulation for many years after independence.

Under the terms of the Coinage Act 1926, the Finance Minister was authorised to issue coins of silver, nickel, and bronze of the same denominations as the British coins already in circulation – however, the Irish silver coins were to contain 75% silver as compared to the 50% silver coins issued by Britain at the time. These coins entered circulation on 12 December 1928.

Under the terms of the Currency Act 1927, a new unit of currency, the Saorstát Pound (Free State Pound) was created, which was to be maintained at parity with the British Pound Sterling by the Currency Commission of Ireland, a currency board. This would hold British government securities, Pounds Sterling cash and gold, so as to keep a 1:1 relationship between the Irish and British currencies. Thus, from 1928 to 1979, Ireland was in the UK-controlled Sterling area.

=== Foundation of the Central Bank to decimalisation (1942–1971) ===
Although the Central Bank Act 1942 (effective 1 February 1943) renamed the Currency Commission, the new institution initially lacked traditional central banking functions:

- it was not given custody of the cash reserves of the commercial banks
- it had no statutory power to restrict credit, though it could promote it
- the Bank of Ireland remained the government's banker
- the conditions for influencing credit through open-market operations did not yet exist
- Ireland's external monetary reserves were largely held as external assets of the commercial banks

The mid-1960s saw the Bank take over the normal day-to-day operations of exchange control from the Department of Finance. The Central Bank broadened its activities over the decades, but it remained in effect a currency board until the 1970s. Economist Patrick Honohan evaluates the success of the movement from a currency board to the central bank as follows: 'in contrast to many other post-colonial cases, (the currency board's) demise was not followed by a rapid depreciation and slide into semi-permanent high inflation and lack of convertibility.

Such was the proliferation of small industrial banks and hire purchase firms in the late 1960s, the 1971 Central Bank Act was introduced to enhance authorisation and supervision standards significantly.

=== Decimalisation to European integration (1971–1978) ===
The 1970s was a decade of change, which began with the decimalisation of the currency which came into effect on 15 February 1971, when the decimal coinage was released into circulation, concurrently with the same process in the United Kingdom.

In 1972, the Bretton Woods system of fixed exchange rates broke down and, in the wake of the 1973 oil crisis, inflation in Britain increased dramatically. As economic theory would suggest that a smaller economy whose currency is pegged to a larger one will suffer the larger economy's inflation rate, the option to discontinue the link with sterling began to be considered. Simultaneously, the creation of a Dublin money market and the 1968 transfer of commercial banks' Pound Sterling assets to the Central Bank created the technical capacity to break the sterling link. In the mid to late 1970s, opinion within the bank was moving toward breaking the link with the Pound Sterling and devaluing the Irish currency in order to limit inflationary effects from abroad.

=== The EMS and movement toward a single European currency ===
In April 1978, the European Council meeting in Copenhagen decided to create a "zone of monetary stability" in Europe, and European Economic Community institutions were invited to consider how to create such a zone. At the following Council meeting in Bremen (Germany) in June 1978, the basic features of the European Monetary System (EMS) were outlined, including the creation of the European Currency Unit (ECU), a basket of the Community's currencies used as a unit of account used to price some international financial transactions and capital transfers, and the forerunner of the Euro.

The Irish government had to decide whether or not to participate in the EMS. If the EMS had included all the European Economic Community's currencies, it would have provided stability for 75% of Ireland's external trade, but Britain, which still accounted for 50% of Ireland's external trade, decided to stay out of the EMS. Despite this, on 15 December 1978, the government announced that Ireland would participate in the EMS. Countries were given the option of either a 2.25% or 6% margin of fluctuation within the EMS' Exchange Rate Mechanism (ERM), and Ireland took the narrower margin. The EMS started on 13 March 1979, and towards the end of the month the Pound Sterling started to appreciate against the EMS currencies because of rising oil prices. By 30 March the Pound Sterling breached the upper fluctuation band limit of the Belgian franc and the Irish currency could no longer both track Sterling and remain in EMS. After over 50 years, the parity of the Irish and British currencies was broken, and the Irish currency became known as the Irish pound (or Punt in Irish).

The initial experience of the EMS was disappointing. It had been expected that the Irish Pound would appreciate in value against the Pound Sterling, and hence reduce inflation in Ireland, but in practice, Sterling appreciated considerably in value thanks to its status as a petrocurrency and to the tight monetary policies of the new British government of Margaret Thatcher. By late 1980 the Irish Pound had fallen in value to less than 80 British pence, and Irish inflation was higher than British. Economic policy in Ireland was inconsistent with a "hard currency" policy, and the Irish Pound also failed to hold its value against the central rate of the Deutschmark, although it did appreciate against some of the other EMS currencies.

Eventually, the EMS settled down (notwithstanding a crisis in 1992 when the Irish Pound was devalued by 10%), and Irish inflation was the same or lower than Britain's inflation rate from 1987 onwards.

=== Towards the Euro ===
The idea of a single European currency goes back to the Schumann Plan of 1950. The first blueprint for how to go about implementing the currency, the Werner Report of 1970, was not proceeded with but the ultimate aim was always kept in mind. The Delors Report endorsed by the Madrid Summit of June 1989 envisaged a three-stage process to monetary union, and this was given legal authority by the Maastricht Treaty of 1992 (enacted into Irish law as the Eleventh Amendment to the Constitution of Ireland by 70% of those voting in a referendum on 18 June 1992). This envisaged the start of monetary union on 1 January 1999 and the introduction of notes and coins on 1 January 2002.

The Central Bank began production of euro coins in September 1999 in the Currency Centre (Irish Mint) in Sandyford, producing over a billion coins, weighing about 5,000 tons, with a value of €230 million before the introduction into circulation of the euro coins in January 2002. Production of euro banknotes began in June 2000, with 300 million notes worth €4 billion being produced in denominations of 5, 10, 20, 50, and 100 euros. Euro banknotes produced for the Central Bank are identified by having the serial number beginning with the letter T. The Bank did not initially issue €200 or €500 notes but subsequently began to do so.

=== Domestic banking crisis ===
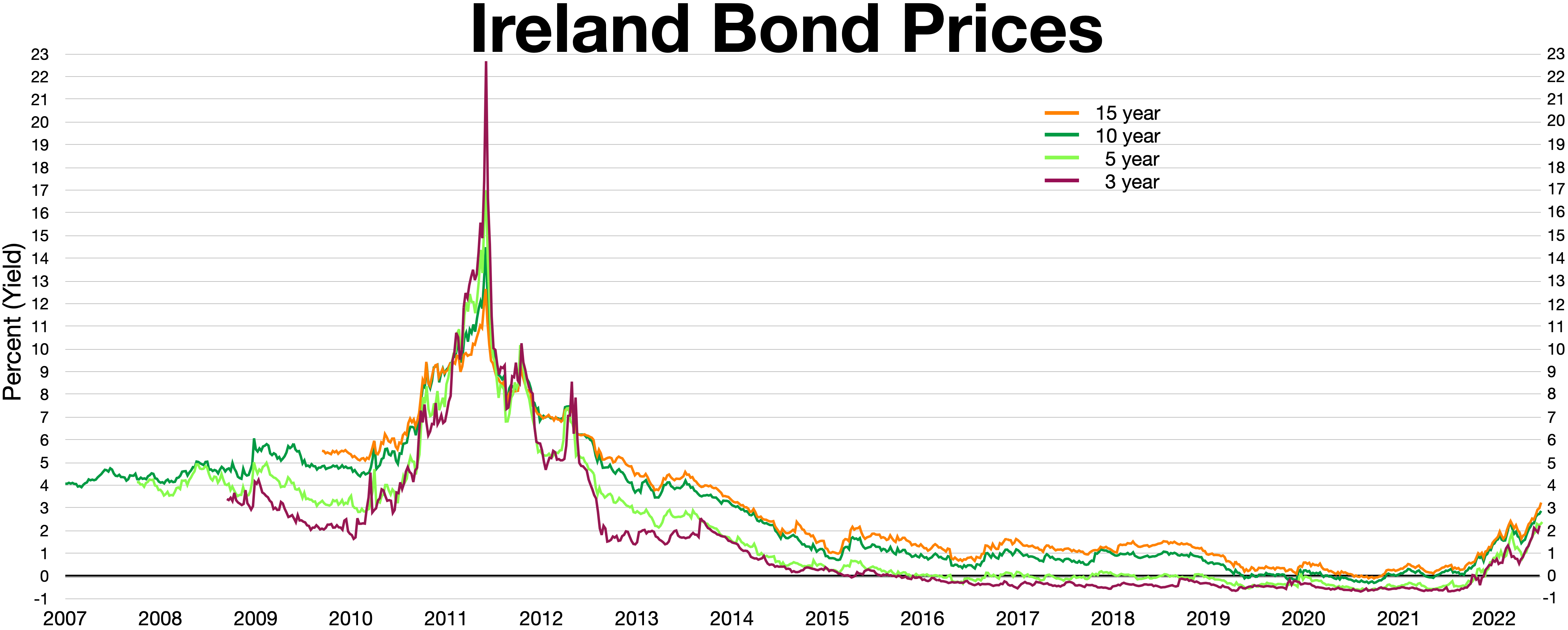
Ireland bond prices, Inverted yield curve in 2011 15 year bond 10 year bond 5 year bond 3 year bond

The Central Bank noted in November 2005 that an overvaluation existed of 40% to 60% in the Irish residential property market. Minutes of a meeting with the OECD indicated that while the Central Bank agreed that Irish property was overvalued it was fearful of precipitating a crash by "putting a number on it". Senior Allied Irish Bank officials expressed concerns in 2006 that Central Bank stress tests were "not stressful enough". Management ignored warnings from the Bank's financial stability unit and from the Economic and Social Research Institute, regarding excessive lending to property speculators and developers. A parliamentary inquiry later questioned the credibility of this former staff member's testimony. Also ignored was key information from the Economic and Social Research Institute about the scale of bank loans to property speculators and developers, It was reported that the Central Bank sought to prevent a prominent economist from talking about the fragile state of the nation's banks in relation the Irish branch of Northern Rock. The same sources stated that the Central Bank "watered down" economic warnings about the property bubble in the run-up to the crash, blocked internal communication reaching board level due to the political interests, and "rigorously" concealed data from the relevant external supervisors on the large exposures of Irish banks to individual developers.

In November 2007, they stated: "The Irish banking system continues to be well-placed to withstand adverse economic and sectoral developments in the short to medium term. The underlying fundamentals of the residential market continue to appear strong and the current trend in monthly price developments does not imply a sharp correction. The central scenario, therefore, is for a soft landing."

After the bubble burst, Irish banks faced mounting losses which exposed them to a collapse of confidence following the Lehman Brothers bankruptcy in September 2008; they then suffered acute liquidity pressures which had to be met by Central Bank support, including emergency lending. Management abuses were also revealed at Anglo Irish Bank, which had to be nationalised in January 2009.

The Central Bank annual report, published three months before the Irish State unconditionally guaranteed the deposits of Irish-owned banks, said: "The banks have negligible exposure to the sub-prime sector and they remain relatively healthy by the standard measures of capital, profitability and asset quality. This has been confirmed by the stress testing exercises we have carried out with the banks".

The next annual report had little to say about how and why the Irish banking system collapsed. Although there were four Central Bank directors on the board of the Financial Regulator, the Central Bank maintained it had no powers to intervene in the market. Yet, the Central Bank had the power to issue directives to the Financial Regulator if it thought it was conducting its business in a way that was contrary to overall Central Bank policy aims. None were issued.

The regulator's processes and reports, and the findings of external scrutineers, any of which should have raised red flags, failed to do so. As a result, they did not see the enormity of the risks being taken by the banks and the calamity that was to overwhelm them.

The European Commission in a November 2010 review of the 2008 financial crisis said: "Some national supervisory authorities failed dramatically. We know that in Ireland there was almost no supervision of the large banks." Two months later, the President of the EU Commission in an angry exchange in the European Parliament, with a vehemence that shocked his audience, said that "the problems of Ireland were created by the irresponsible financial behaviour of some Irish institutions, and by the lack of supervision in the Irish market."

=== Separation of regulation – The Financial Regulator ===
In 2003 a new separate division of the Central Bank, with its own chairman, chief executive, and board, was established as the Irish Financial Services Regulatory Authority. This was a compromise between those who favoured a fully independent regulator and those who believed the Central Bank should maintain full control of regulation of the financial services industry. This division of the Bank authorised and regulated all financial institutions (including insurance undertakings, collective investment funds and credit unions) in Ireland. The "Central Bank of Ireland" was formally renamed Central Bank and Financial Services Authority of Ireland (CBFSAI). (There was no entity named "Financial Services Authority of Ireland".)

Under the 2003 arrangements, the Central Bank provided the Financial Regulator with services. The Regulator's industry panel, which provided the Regulator with feedback on its charges and policies said in April 2007 that they had "major concerns with the quality and cost of the services" provided to the Regulator by the Central Bank.

The operations of the Financial Regulator were severely criticised in a report marked "strictly confidential and not for publication", as being poor value for money. The report stated that there were too few specialist staff, compared with its peers. There were also serious shortcomings in the crucial supervisory area. and the report was particularly critical of the regulator's senior management structure, concluding that a clear management and oversight framework, which ensures that issues are escalated through the organisation, was "not fully in place".

Former Taoiseach Bertie Ahern stated that creating a separate financial regulator in 2003 contributed to the banking system's vulnerability, as it fragmented oversight and created gaps in supervision, saying "if I had a chance again I wouldn't do it". Ahern said: "The banks were irresponsible. But the Central Bank and the Financial Regulator seemed happy. They were never into us saying – ever – 'Listen, we must put legislation and control on the banks'. That never happened."

In April 2010, the new Financial Regulator, outlined his shock at the poor level of financial regulation he discovered when he started his job the previous January and "it is clear to me we need to undertake a fundamental overhaul of the regulatory model for financial services in Ireland." He also said that there was a "critical absence of intellectual firepower within his staff".

Following the banking collapse of 2008 and 2009, the Government re-unified the organisation under a Central Bank of Ireland Commission to replace the board structures of the Central Bank and the Financial Services Regulatory Authority which became effective on 1 October 2010. The name "Central Bank of Ireland" was restored. A July 2009 editorial in the Sunday Business Post said "returning the key powers of regulation to the Central Bank will be useless unless there is a fundamental change in the culture of the organisation. This does not require a complete change of personnel, but a change of key personnel." Several commentators have argued that the spinning off of the Financial Regulator from the functions of the Central Bank in 2003 was a failure.

=== Post crisis reforms ===
On 4 November 2014 the European Central Bank formally took supervisory control over the biggest banks in Europe, including those in Ireland. While banking supervision staff in the Central Bank of Ireland remained, a pan-European approach to how banks were supervised was introduced, known as European Banking Supervision.

Subsequent to the parliamentary inquiry into the domestic banking crisis, the organization said that the actions taken by the Central Bank combined with legislative reform and an overhaul of international regulation have enabled the organization to deliver effective supervision and financial stability measures since the crisis. Governor Philip Lane said, "The report describes a failure to identify risks to financial stability and recognizes the lack of an overall European framework to deal with the financial and fiscal crises. Many of the issues identified by the Inquiry relating to the Central Bank have been substantially addressed or continue to be addressed through measures including significant institutional reform, additional powers, the promotion of a culture of challenge and the implementation of the model of assertive risk-based supervision underpinned by a credible threat of enforcement."

In early 2015, the Central Bank introduced macro-prudential mortgage regulations to increase the resilience of the banking and household sectors to the property market and to reduce the risk of bank credit and house price spirals from developing in the future. These measures are to be reviewed annually, with the first report published in November 2016.

In response to the July 2016 leprechaun economics affair, on the request of the Central Statistics Office ("CSO"), the Governor of the Central Bank chaired a cross economic steering group (Economic Statistics Review Group, or "ESRG") including the IFAC, ESRI, NTMA, leading academics and the Department of Finance, to recommend new economic statistics to the CSO, that would better represent the Irish economy (given the escalating distortions in GDP and GNP). In response, the Central Bank and Central Statistics Office developed "modified GNI" (or GNI*) to better reflect Ireland's economy. Report Site of the ESRG. 2016 Modified GNI* is 70% of 2016 GDP (or 2016 GDP is 143% of 2016 GNI*).

=== Historical archives and data ===
The Central Bank opened its archives to the public in 2017 operating a 30 year rule for the release of records. The archives can be accessed by means of the Banks online finding aid and consulted in the Bank's North Wall Quay premises in Dublin.

The bank releases data on the changing wealth of Irish households.

== Responsibilities ==
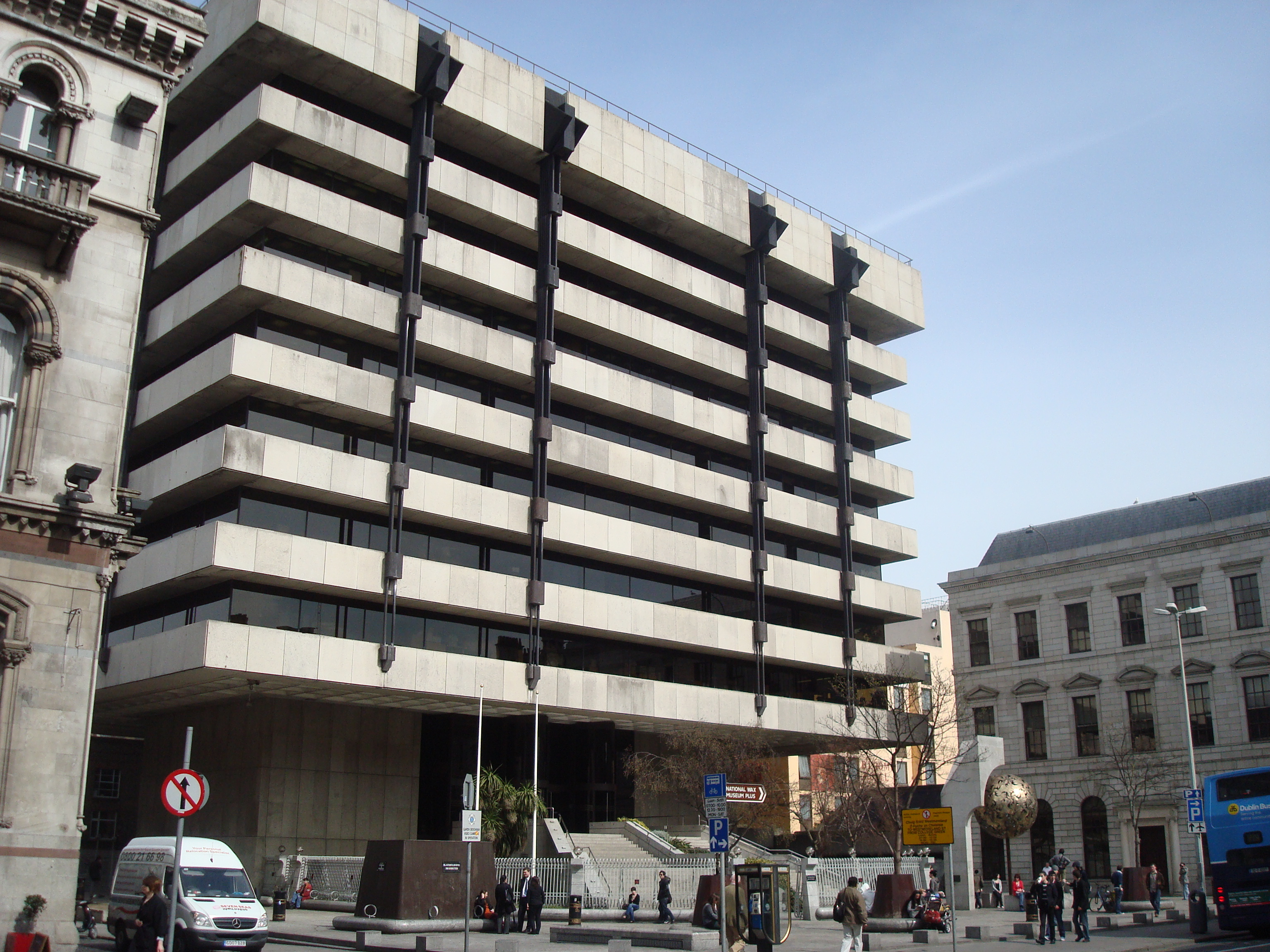
The former Central Bank of Ireland headquarters building on Dame Street, Dublin City

The Central Bank of Ireland's statutory mandate requires it to promote the well-being of Irish and European citizens through several key responsibilities, including:

- price stability;
- financial stability;
- consumer protection;
- supervision and enforcement;
- regulatory policy development;
- payment, settlement and currency systems operations and oversight;
- the provision of economic advice and financial statistics; and
- the recovery and resolution of distressed financial services firms.

== Buildings ==
Its head office, the Central Bank of Ireland building, was located on Dame Street, Dublin from 1979 until 2017. Its offices at Iveagh Court and College Green also closed down at the same time. Since March 2017, its headquarters are located on North Wall Quay, where the public may exchange non-current Irish coinage and currency (both pre- and post-decimalization) for Euros, as well as high value Euro banknotes and "mutilated" currency. It also operates from premises at nearby Spencer Dock. The Currency Centre (Irish Mint) at Sandyford is the currency manufacture, warehouse and distribution site of the bank.

== Governors ==
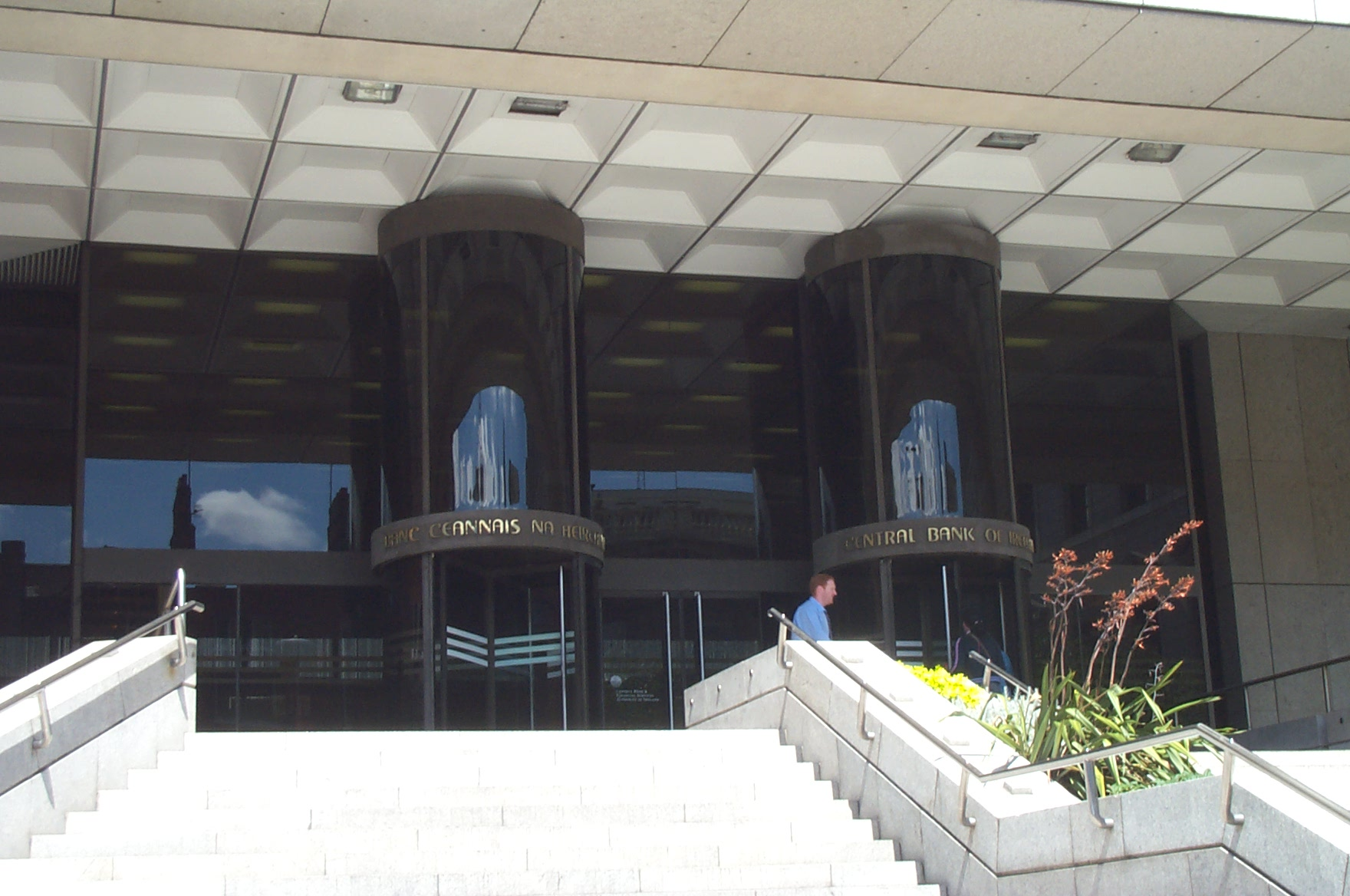
The main entrance to the Central Bank of Ireland's former head office on Dame Street

The Governor of the Bank is appointed by the President of Ireland on the constitutional advice of the Government of Ireland.

Name (Birth–Death)	Term of office
Joseph Brennan (1887–1963)	1943–1953
James J. McElligott (1890–1974)	1953–1960
Maurice Moynihan (1902–1999)	1960–1969
T. K. Whitaker (1916–2017)	1969–1976
Charles Henry Murray (1917–2008)	1976–1981
Tomás F. Ó Cofaigh (1921–2015)	1981–1987
Maurice F. Doyle</ref> (1932–2009)	1987–1994
Maurice O'Connell (1936–2019)	1994–2002
John Hurley (1945–)	2002–2009
Patrick Honohan (1949–)	2009–2015
Philip R. Lane (1969–)	2015–2019
Gabriel Makhlouf (1960–)	2019–present

== Criticisms ==
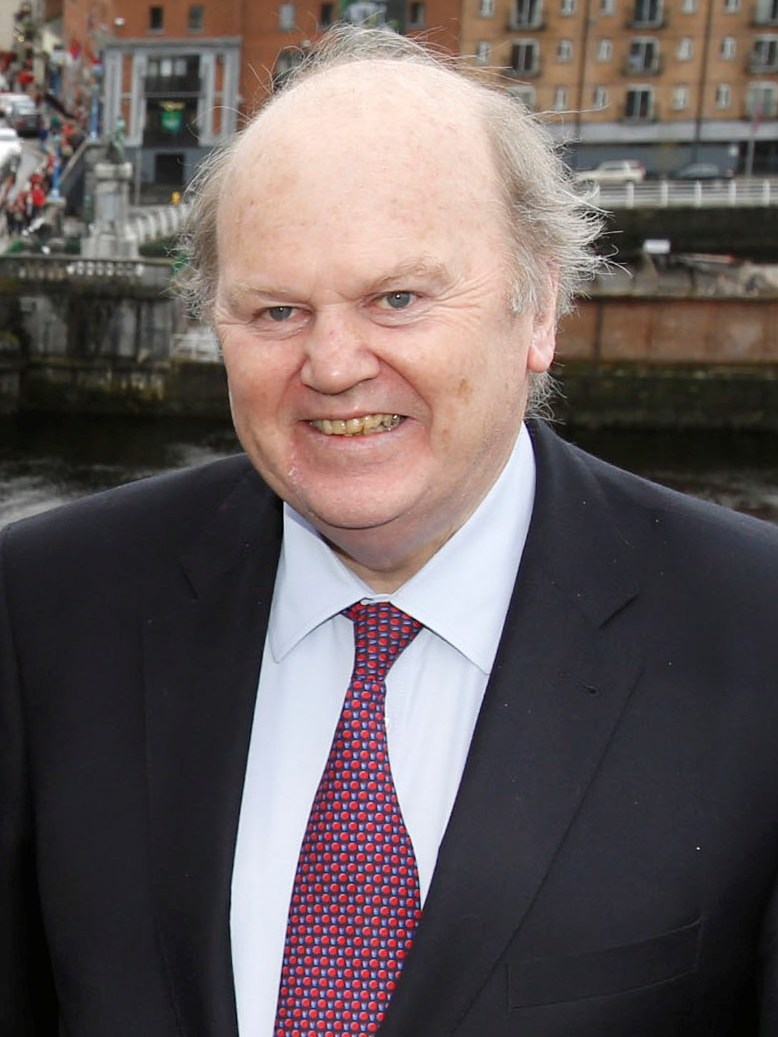
In 2016, Irish Finance Minister, Michael Noonan, told an Irish MEP to "put on the green jersey" when told of a new Irish corporate BEPS tax tool to replace the prohibited “Double Irish" tool.

Recurrent criticisms were made both before and after the Irish banking crisis, of the Central Bank of Ireland. As seen in the Irish banking crisis, when global markets are stressed, several of these issues can occur simultaneously (i.e. they are not independent risks), to amplify the seriousness of the situation. While the pre-crisis Central Bank of Ireland was judged to fail on all these criticisms, the Irish State had the financial resources to bail out the Irish banking system (Ireland was almost debt-free before the crisis). Post‑bailout, the Irish State’s debt‑to‑GNI* ratio has exceeded 100%. Some analysts have argued that a similar failure by the Central Bank could be more difficult for the State to absorb and might increase the risk of creditor restructuring.

=== Green jersey agenda ===
In 2016, several Irish bank CEOs testified that senior Central Bank officials during 2007–2011 encouraged a "green jersey agenda"—prioritizing national economic interests over transparency—which enabled banks to obscure the deteriorating financial system. After the 2011–bailout by the EU–ECB–IMF (e.g. the European troika) of the Irish banking system, a number of non–Irish senior executives were placed in the Central Bank of Ireland, including the Board of the Bank. However, by 2017, almost all these non–Irish executives had departed the Central Bank, and some have publicised concerns about the Central Bank's tendency to push aside risk-management in pursuit of political and Government objectives.

=== Mortgage controls post crisis ===
The Irish Celtic Tiger era was typified by large, interest-only mortgages, at high levels of loan-to-income values. After the 2011 bailout, the Central Bank introduced macro–prudential controls on mortgage lending both in terms of loan-to-value (a cap of 80% and 90% depending on circumstances), and loan-to-income (a cap of 3.5 times income). A limited number of exemptions to these are available to Irish banks for both of these rules on an annual basis. Additionally, the Irish Government introduced a Help To Buy scheme, which allows first-time buyers to receive 5% of the cost price of a house as an income tax rebate – which loosened the LTI requirements further for eligible first-time buyers. The post-2008 Irish economic downturn showed the small and unusual nature of Ireland's economy (e.g. where a small number of U.S. corporates are 80% of Irish tax, 25% of Irish labour, 25 of top 50 Irish firms, and 57% of Irish value-add), led to foreign banks rapidly withdrawing capital from Ireland in times of stress.

=== Light-touch regulation ===
In 2017, it was shown that brochures of IFSC services firms market Ireland as a "light-touch" regulatory regime. The Central Bank itself was paying rent to a US distressed debt-landlord who was using a Central Bank-regulated ICAV structure to avoid all Irish taxes. In February 2018, the Central Bank expanded the little-used L–QIAIF vehicle to give the tax benefits as Section 110 SPVs but without requiring public accounts for the Irish CRO, which was how the abuses above were uncovered. In June 2018, the Central Bank reported that distressed debt funds switched €55 billion, or 25% of Irish GNI*, out of Section 110 SPVs, and presumably into L–QIAIFs. These actions have been described by some tax experts as characteristic of a "captured state".

=== Distorted economic data ===
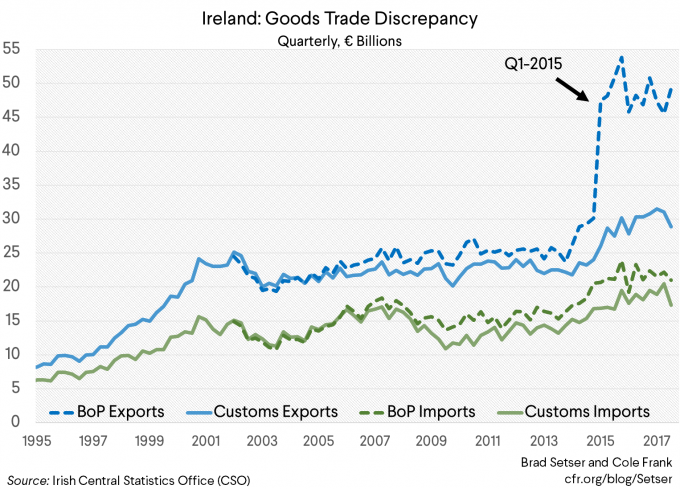
Apple's Q1 2015 Irish "quasi-inversion" of its $300 billion international IP is the largest recorded individual BEPS action in history, and almost double the 2016 blocked $160 billion Pfizer–Allergan Irish corporate inversion. Brad Setser & Cole Frank (Council on Foreign Relations)

A June 2018 academic study characterised Ireland as a "major tax haven" and argued that, on certain measures, it was the world’s largest tax haven. In common with all tax havens, Ireland's economic data is distorted by the BEPS flows from tax management activities. The top–10 GDP-per-capita countries, excluding natural resource countries, are all tax havens (see GDP-per-capita and tax havens). This was shown dramatically in July 2016 during "leprechaun economics" affair when Apple re-structured its Double Irish BEPS tool, as agreed under an ongoing EU tax-investigation into Apple in Ireland, into a new Irish CAIA arrangement BEPS tool.

At this point, multinational profit shifting doesn't just distort Ireland's balance of payments; it constitutes Ireland’s balance of payments.

— Brad Setser and Cole Frank, Council on Foreign Relations, "Tax Avoidance and the Irish Balance of Payments", 25 April 2018

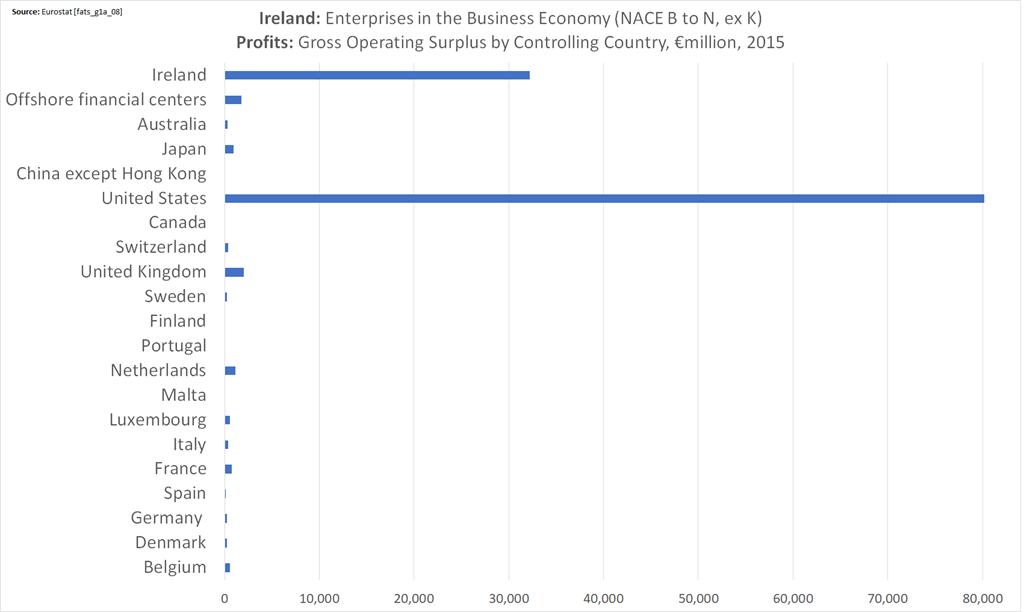
Dominance of U.S. companies: Irish corporate Gross Operating Surplus (i.e. profits), by the controlling country of the company (note: a material part of the Irish figure is also from U.S. tax inversions who are U.S.–controlled). Eurostat (2015).

Exaggerated credit cycles are a documented feature of tax havens as global capital markets misprice the "headline" debt-to-GDP in benign times, only to reprice aggressively in less benign times, leading to a credit crisis (discussed in tax haven credit cycles). In 2017, the Central Bank of Ireland responded to this issue, post-leprehaun economics, by introducing Modified gross national income (or GNI*), as a more appropriate measure for Ireland's economy.

Ireland has, more or less, stopped using GDP to measure its own economy. And on current trends [because Irish GDP is distorting EU–28 aggregate data], the eurozone taken as a whole may need to consider something similar.

— Brad Setser, Council on Foreign Relations, "Ireland exports its Leprechaun", 25 April 2018

The issues post-leprechaun economics, and "Modified GNI", are captured on page 34 of the OECD 2018 Ireland survey:

1. On a Gross Public Debt-to-GDP basis, Ireland's 2015 figure at 78.8% is not of concern;
2. On a Gross Public Debt-to-GNI* basis, Ireland's 2015 figure at 116.5% is more serious, but not alarming;
3. On a Gross Public Debt-Per-Capita basis, Ireland's 2015 figure at over $62,686 per capita, exceeds every other OECD country, except Japan.

=== Commercial property bubbles ===
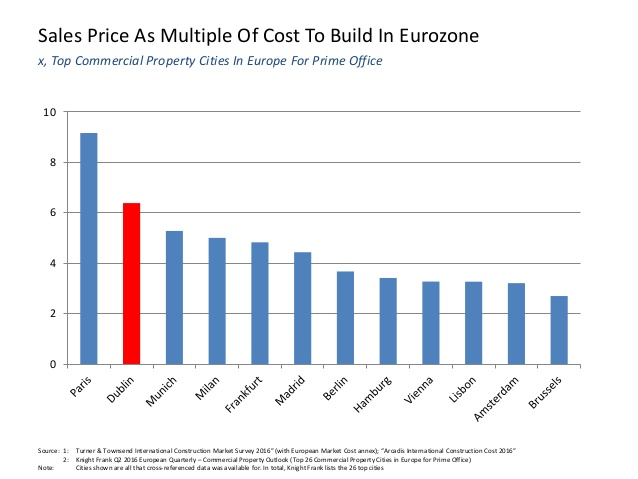
Comparison of the sales price as multiple of the cost of build, for a prime office in Dublin, with other eurozone countries (2016)

Ireland's status as a "major tax haven", and its exposure to a handful of major U.S. multinationals, mean that its commercial property market is prone to overinflating. This effect is amplified because the Irish State enables foreign investors to pay no taxes on Irish commercial property via the Central Bank regulated QIAIFs (and ICAVs in particular). The ratio of the value of prime office in Dublin, to its cost-of-build, is the second-largest in the Eurozone, and only exceeded by Paris. Irish office rents are close to London City office rents.

Irish banks are the main lending institutions to Irish commercial property, and thus most exposed to material price distortions. As was seen in the Irish banking crisis, when global conditions weaken and the demand for Irish office space falls, the drop in Irish commercial valuations is more extreme than other markets. When this occurs in-sync with a global repricing of Irish credit, from a realisation of the level of artificial distortion in Irish economic data, the effects are further amplified. This risk was highlighted in 2014 when the Central Bank consulted the European Systemic Risk Board ("ESRB") after lobbying by IFSC tax-law firms to expand the L–QIAIF vehicle. While the Central Bank agreed with the ESRB in 2014, it changed its mind in 2018, and decided to materially expand the L–QIAIFs vehicle (see § Light-touch regulation).

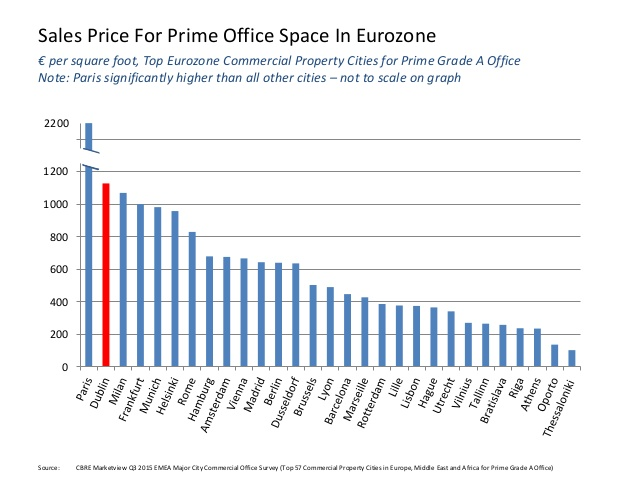
Comparison of the sales price of Dublin prime office with other EU–28 countries (2016)

The longer-term risks of Irish commercial property were further increased with the U.S. Tax Cuts and Jobs Act of 2017, which fundamentally reduces the attractiveness of Ireland to U.S. multinationals, and could see Ireland lose its status as the major U.S. corporate tax haven.

=== Control of total credit ===
Irish § Distorted economic data and the tendency to commercial and residential property bubbles has led to periods when Ireland's economy was over-leveraged and reliant on foreign capital. The ability of foreign capital to use Ireland's tax haven tools (IP–based BEPS tools, and Debt–based BEPS tools) to avoid Irish taxes, attracts further non-domestic credit. It has been shown that smaller countries with a high proportion of non–domestic capital are prone to severe credit cycles. To resolve this imbalance, in the post-2008 Irish economic downturn, Irish private-sector debt was transferred to Irish public-sector debt. The result is that Ireland is now one of the EU–28's most leveraged countries on a private and public sector basis (when measured GNI or per-Capita measures, to limit the distortion by Irish GDP). This level of indebtedness has led some observers to question the State’s capacity to finance another large‑scale banking rescue in the near term.

During the 2008–2012 global credit crisis, reports showed Ireland's combined public and private sector credit as being the highest in the OECD (some reports added in IFSC SPV credit producing higher, but misleading, figures). In this regard, the Central Bank now tracks private and public credit in Ireland in its quarterly bulletins. Private credit is tracked on a credit-to-income ratio, while public sector credit is tracked on a debt-to-GNI* ratio. In addition, as part of the post-crisis reforms, the independent statutory body, the Irish Fiscal Advisory Council, also reports on Irish leverage (public and private) and its sustainability. Some commentators have criticised other State bodies (e.g., NTMA and IDA Ireland) for continuing to present debt‑to‑GDP figures in their reports, arguing that these figures understate Ireland’s leverage because of GDP distortions.

=== Israeli state bonds ===
After Brexit, Central Bank of Ireland replaced UK as the approving body for Israel Bonds sale prospectuses. Internationally, after the start of the Gaza war, BDS Movement and Jewish Voice for Peace called for divestment from Israeli bonds "advertised as a way to raise funds for the country’s war efforts". In Ireland, Ireland Palestine Solidarity Campaign launched a campaign demanding from the Central Bank to end its engagement as the EU regulator of these bonds. Following a series of protests, the Campaign lodged proceedings with the Garda Commissioner against Central Bank officials for "criminal offences ancillary to genocide in contravention of Section 8 of the International Criminal Court Act 2006 and Article 25(3)(d) of the Rome Statute of the International Criminal Court."

== See also ==
- Banknotes of the Republic of Ireland
- Coins of Ireland
- Economy of the Republic of Ireland
- Irish pound
- Irish modified GNI (or GNI star)
- Irish Fiscal Advisory Council
- Green Jersey Agenda
- Ireland as a tax haven
- List of central banks
- List of financial supervisory authorities by country
- List of banks in the Republic of Ireland
