= Christ Church Cambridge =

Coordinates: 52.2078°N 0.1332°E

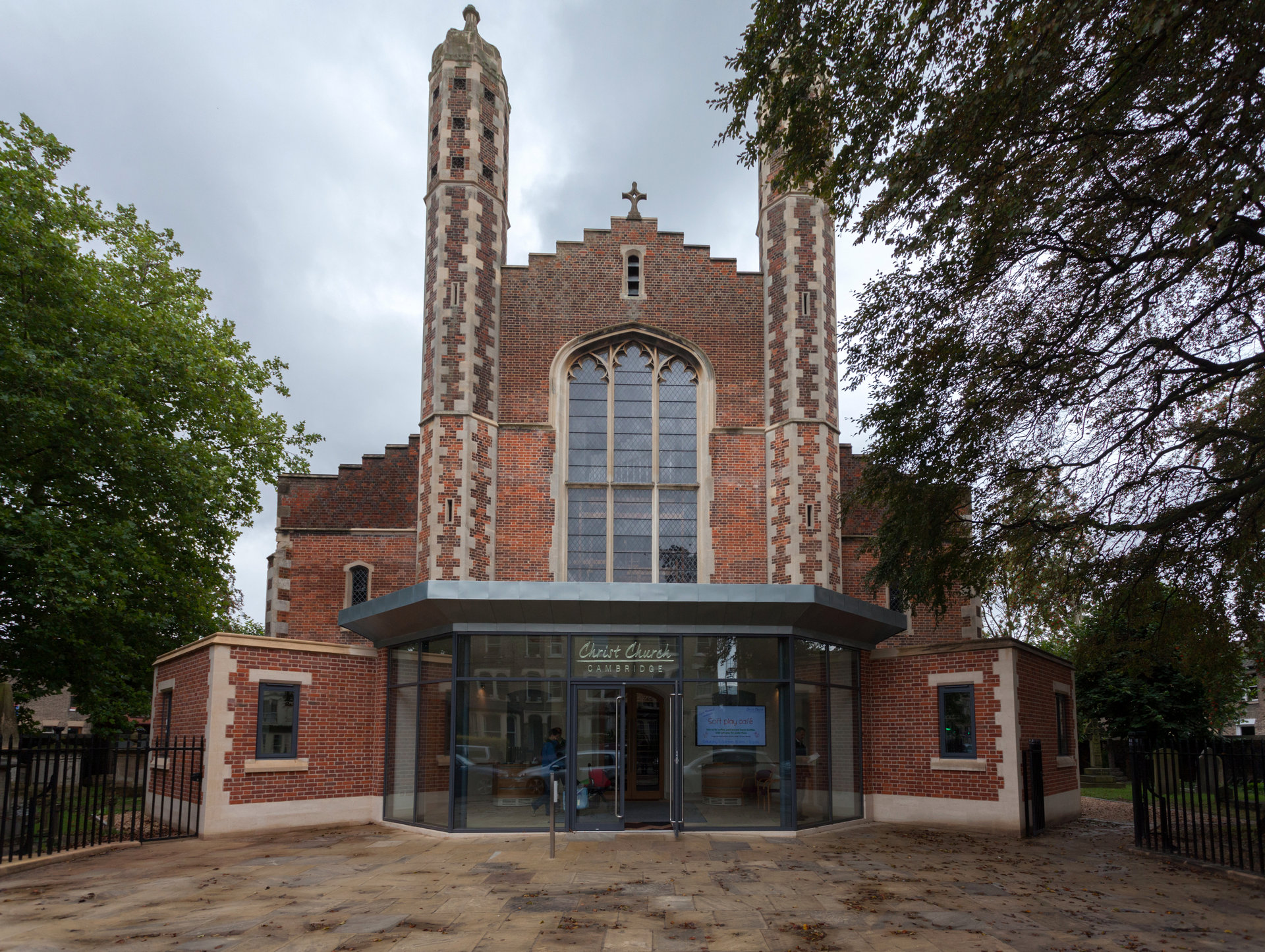
- Christ Church Cambridge
- Country: England
- Denomination: Church of England
- Churchmanship: Conservative Evangelical
- Website: christchurchcambridge.org.uk

Administration
- Diocese: Diocese of Ely

Clergy
- Bishop: The Rt Revd Rob Munro (AEO)
- Vicar: David Todd

Christ Church Cambridge is a Church of England parish church in central Cambridge, England.

The church is within the conservative evangelical tradition and participates in the Reform movement. In 2023 the vicar is Rev. David Todd. Christ Church was a 'grafting' scheme from St Andrew the Great in 2004 when a group of around 100 adults and children moved with Rev. Steve Midgley.

== Activities ==
The church is open for public services every Sunday at 9:30am, 11:15am and 5:00pm. Every other week there is a more traditional service at 3:00pm. There are several Sunday school groups for children in the morning services. Also, there are many group meetings during the week.

== History ==
=== The Abbey Church ===
The little Abbey Church, formerly known as St Andrew the Less, on Newmarket Road, was once overshadowed by Barnwell Priory, which stood behind it, by the river. The only Priory building remaining today is the Cellarer's Chequer at the corner of Beche Road and Priory Road. The Abbey Church was probably built by the Augustinian Canons of the Priory in the early thirteenth century for use by the inhabitants of Barnwell. Only the church and six of the hamlet's 50 houses escaped destruction in a fire on 30 September 1731.

=== Christ Church ===
Christ Church was consecrated by Joseph Allen, Bishop of Ely, on 27 June 1839. It had been built at the cost of £3,800. This amount included a donation of £200 from Charles Perry, a keen evangelist: he was later appointed the first Archbishop of Melbourne.

Christ Church stands in the parish of St Andrew the Less. St Andrew's Church, known today as the Abbey Church, was closed for public worship when Christ Church was built. For this reason, Christ Church was used as the parish church, and in January 1846, the arrangement was formalized legally. The interior of Christ Church is 58 feet wide, 87 feet long, and 44 feet high. Rather than the usual east-west orientation, Christ Church faces south. Stained glass was fitted in 1885. The Sunday school children gave the font cover.

The church was renovated in 1973 and 2013.

=== Present day ===
The church is within the Conservative Evangelical tradition of the Church of England. It has passed resolutions to reject the ordination of women and/or leadership of women. It receives alternative episcopal oversight from the Bishop of Ebbsfleet (currently Rob Munro).

The church is part of the Besom volunteer network in Cambridge as well as the Cambridge Churches Homeless Project.
