= Post box =

Box for collecting outgoing mail

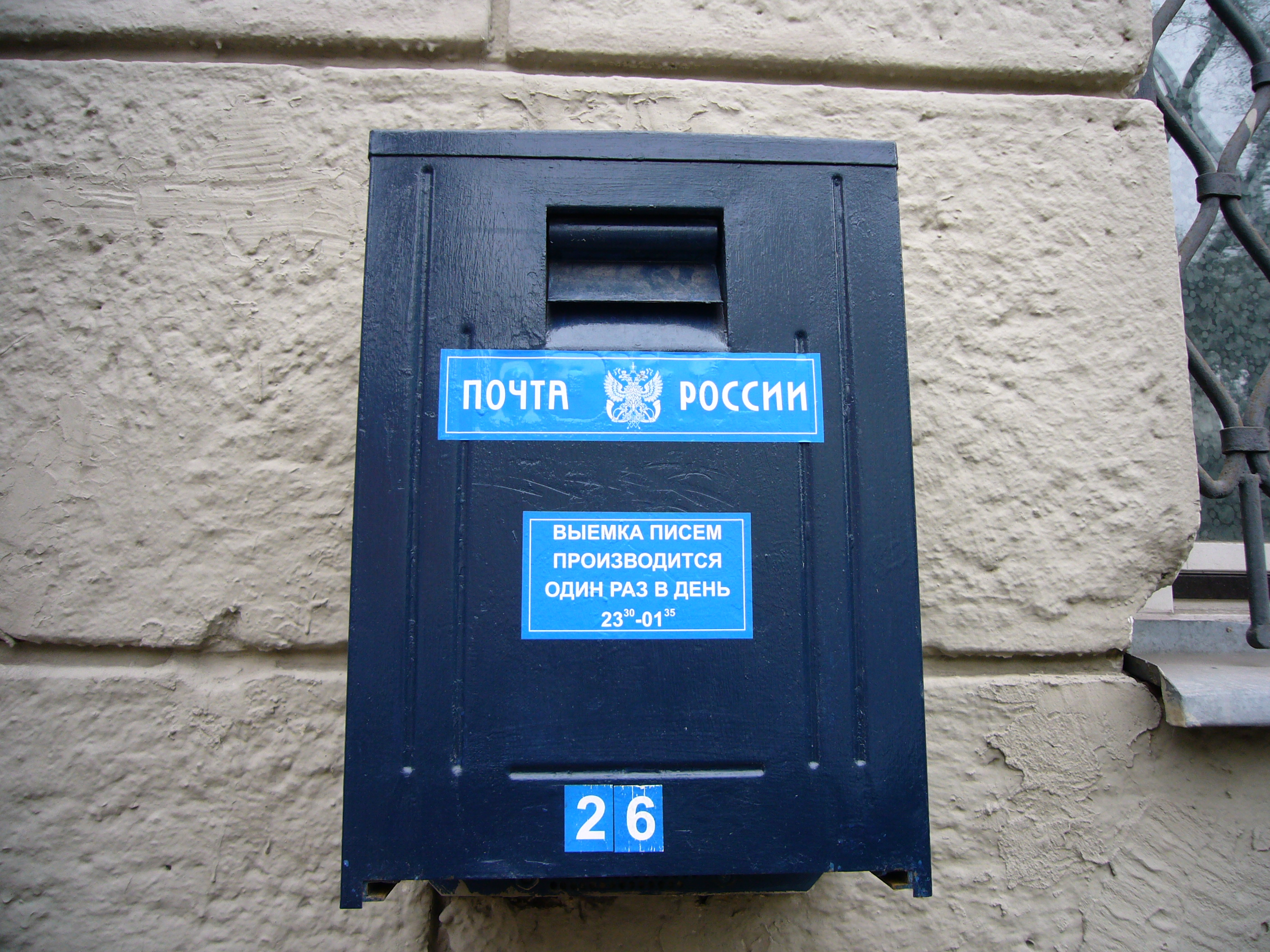
Postbox of the Russian Post in Moscow

A post box (British English; also written postbox; also known as pillar box), also known as a collection box, mailbox, letter box or drop box (American English), is a physical box into which members of the public can deposit outgoing mail intended for collection by the agents of a country's postal service. The term post box can also refer to a private letter box for incoming mail.

== History of post boxes ==
=== Europe ===
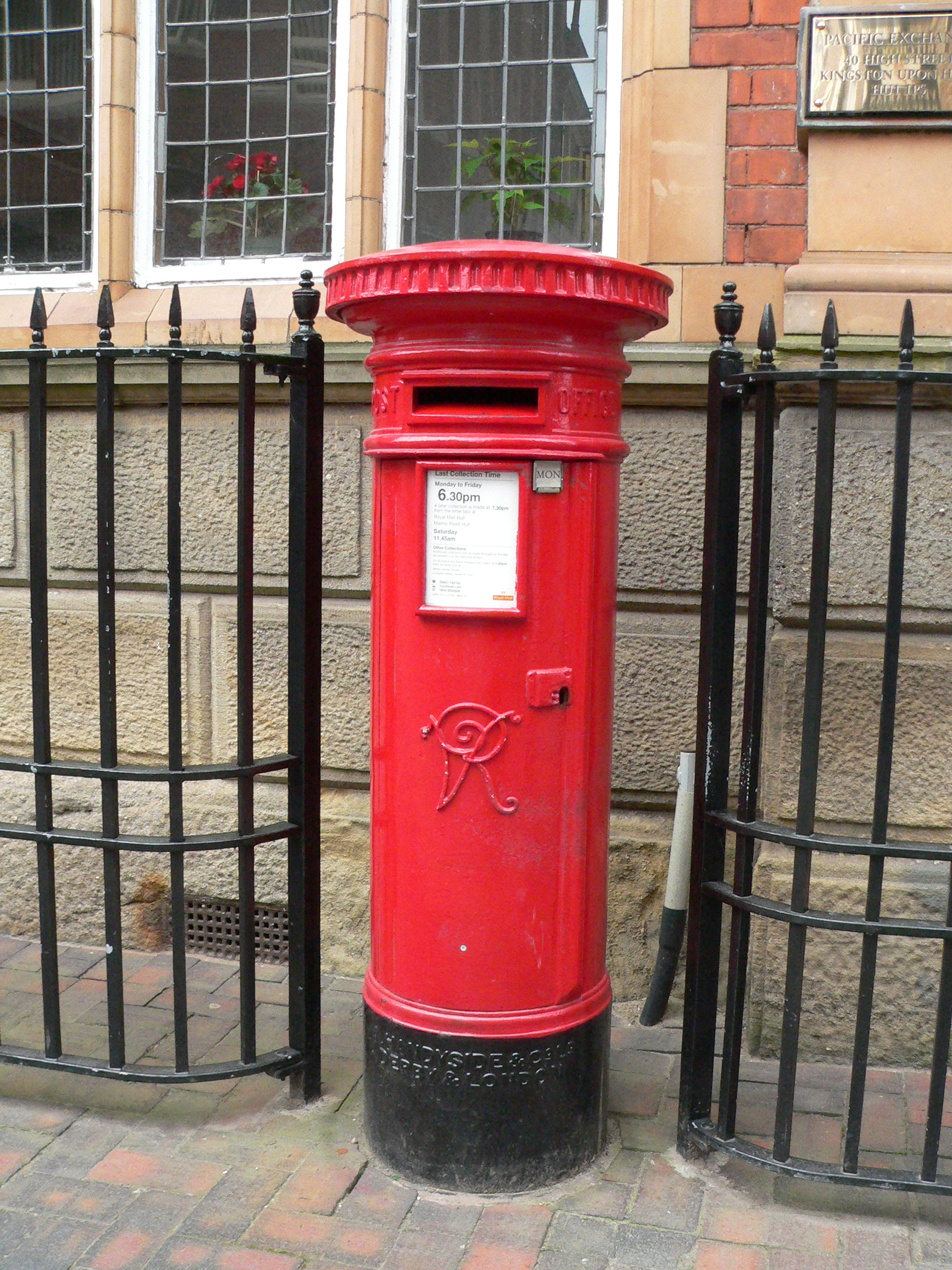
A Victorian era Type B pillar postbox in Hull

In 1653, the first post boxes are believed to have been installed in and around Paris. By 1829, post boxes were in use throughout France. The first public post boxes in Poland were installed in Warsaw in 1842.

A post box originally installed in the wall of the Wakefield Post Office is dated 1809 and is believed to be the oldest example in Britain. It is now on display at the Wakefield Museum.

In Britain, the first red pillar postboxes were erected in Jersey in the November of 1852. This was suggested by Anthony Trollope whilst working as a Postal Surveyor on the Island. None of the original boxes used in Jersey now survive. Roadside wall boxes first appeared in 1857 as a cheaper alternative to pillar boxes, especially in rural districts. In 1853 the first pillar box in the United Kingdom was installed at Botchergate, Carlisle. In 1856, Richard Redgrave of the Department of Science and Art designed an ornate pillar box for use in London and other large cities. In 1859 the design was improved, and this became the first National Standard pillar box. Green was adopted as the standard colour for the early Victorian post boxes. Between 1866 and 1879 the hexagonal Penfold post box became the standard design for pillar boxes and it was during this period that red was first adopted as the standard colour. The first boxes to be painted red were in London in July 1874, although it would be nearly 10 years before all the boxes had been repainted. In 2012, to celebrate Olympic gold medals for Team GB, selected boxes were painted gold.

The first public letter boxes (post boxes) in Russia appeared in 1848 in St. Petersburg. They were made of wood and iron. Because these boxes were lightweight and easily stolen, they disappeared frequently; later boxes were made of cast iron and could weigh up to 45 kilograms (99 lb).

In March 2025, Post Danmark announced it was quitting the letter delivery business at the end of 2025, and as so remove all the post boxes in Denmark. The 1200 post boxes in question would be sold off to collectors, with the money going charity.

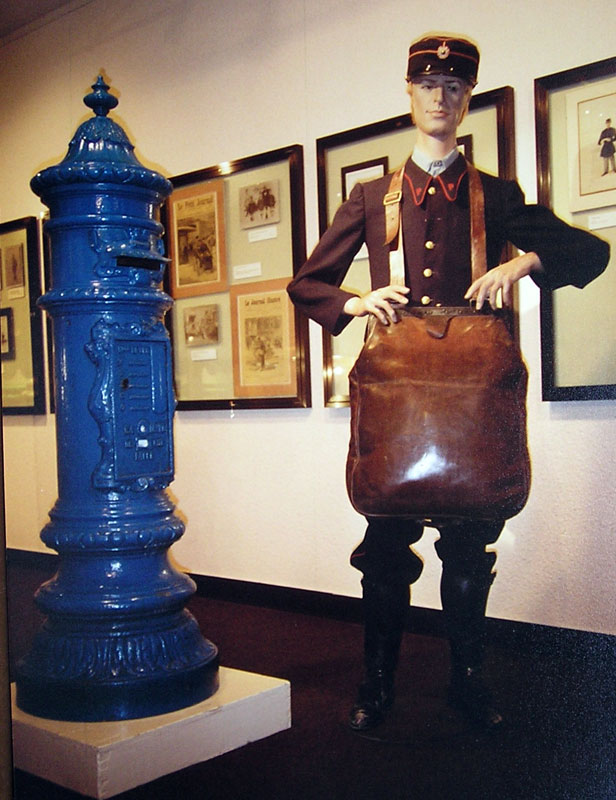
First Paris Street letter box from c. 1850

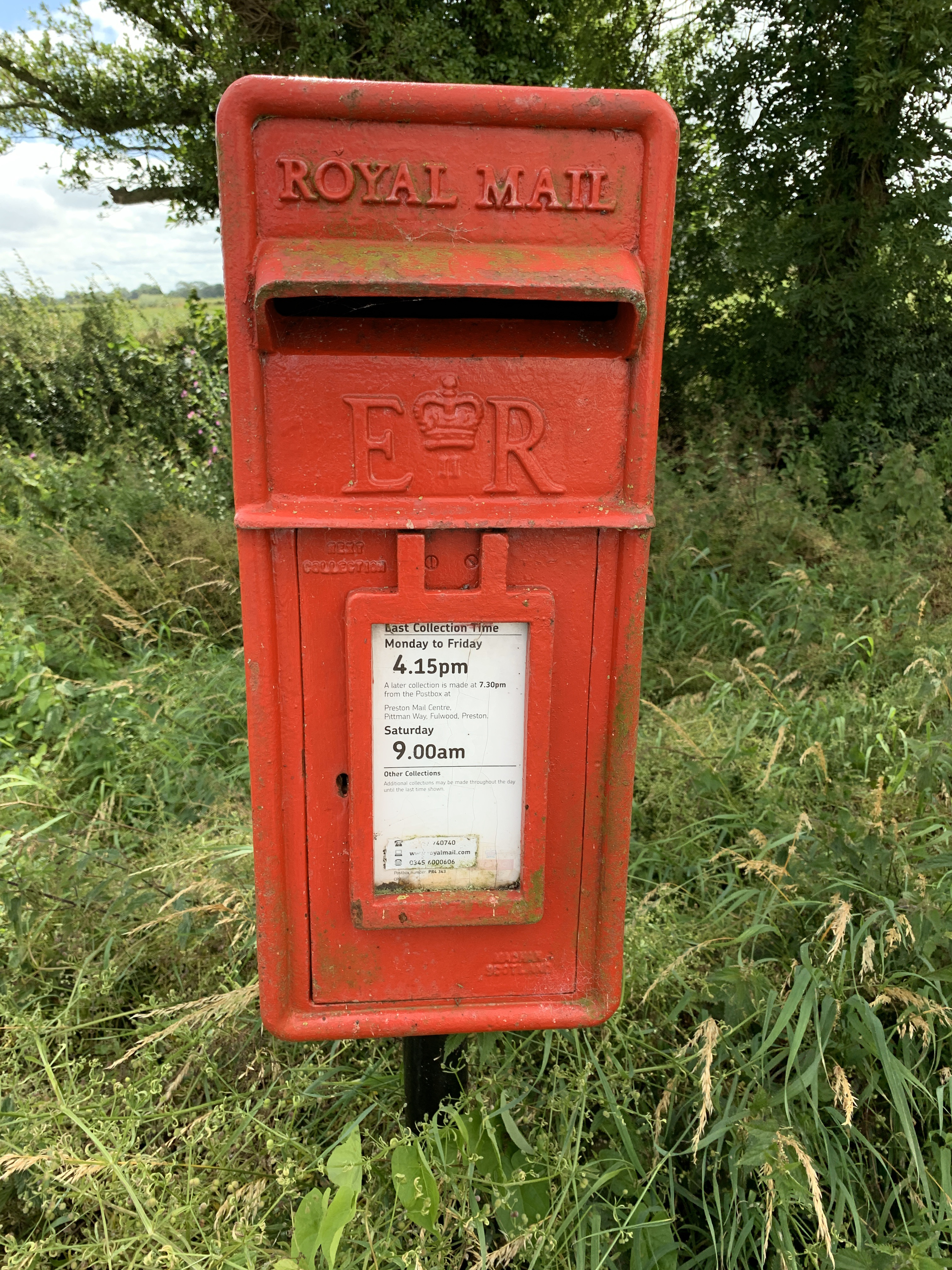
A Queen Elizabeth II Lamp Box post box of the circa-1954 pattern in Eaves, Lancashire

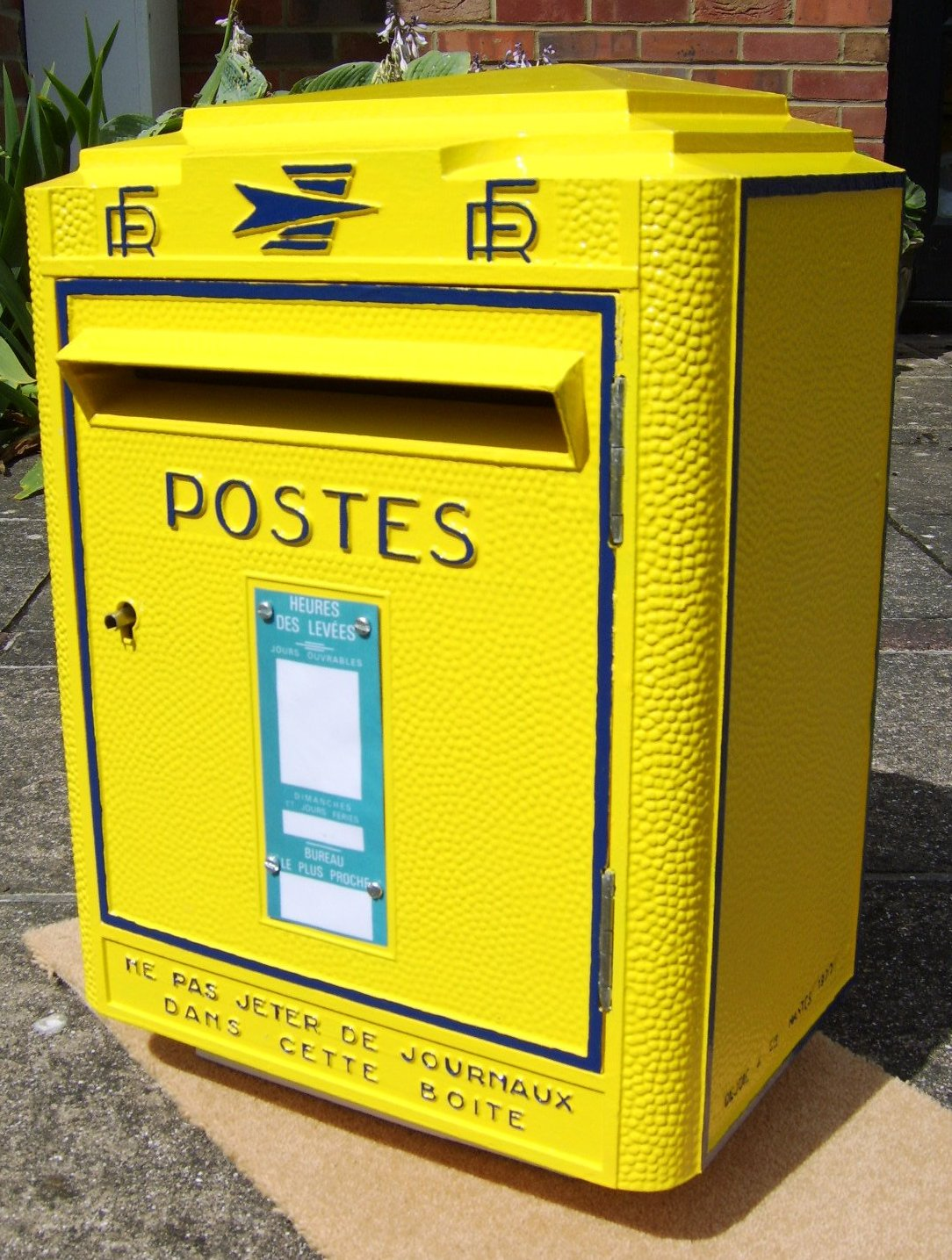
French wall box of the 1977 pattern now on display at the Colne Valley Postal History Museum, Essex

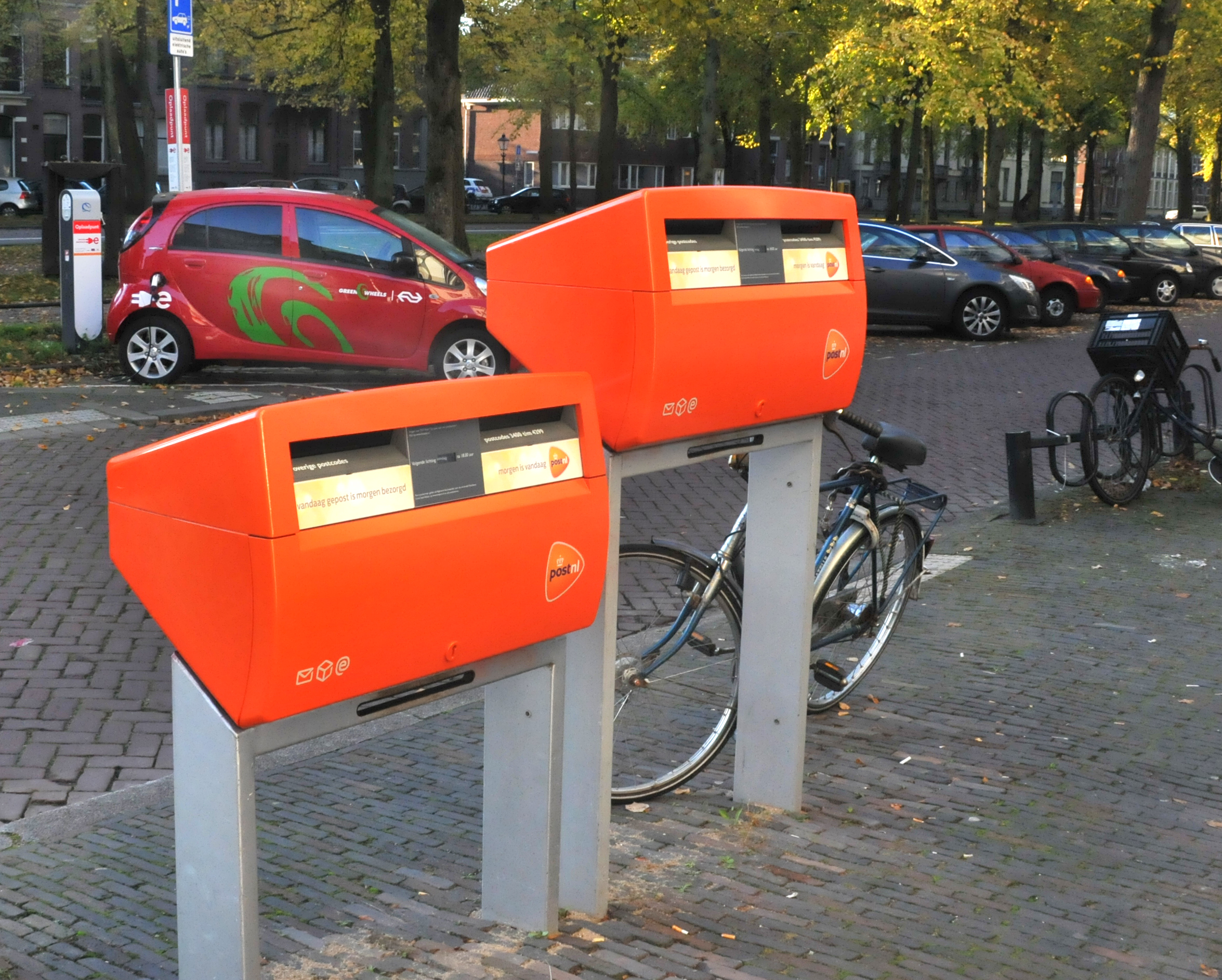
A Dutch "Post-NL" postbox in orange at different heights

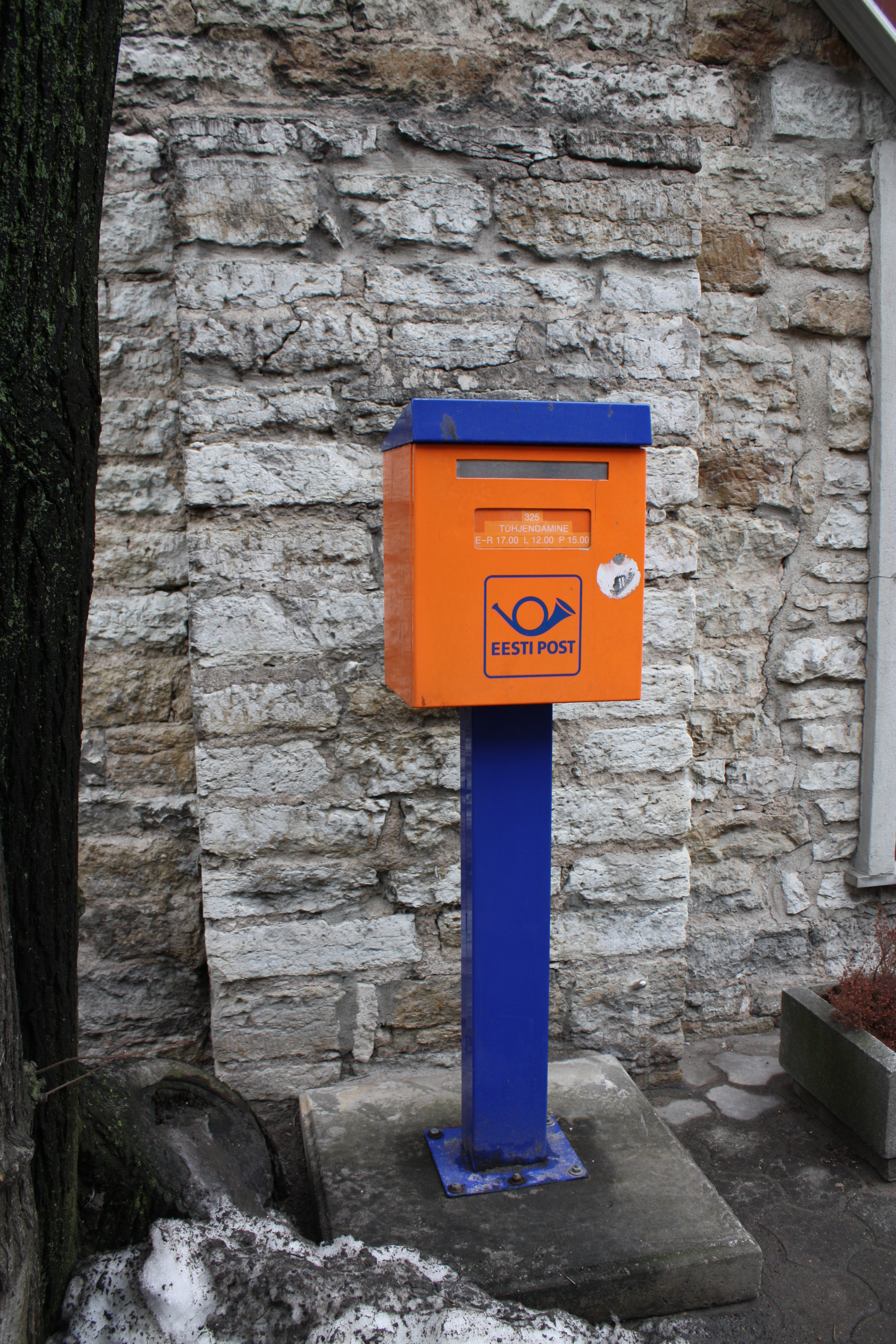
Modern postbox in Estonia

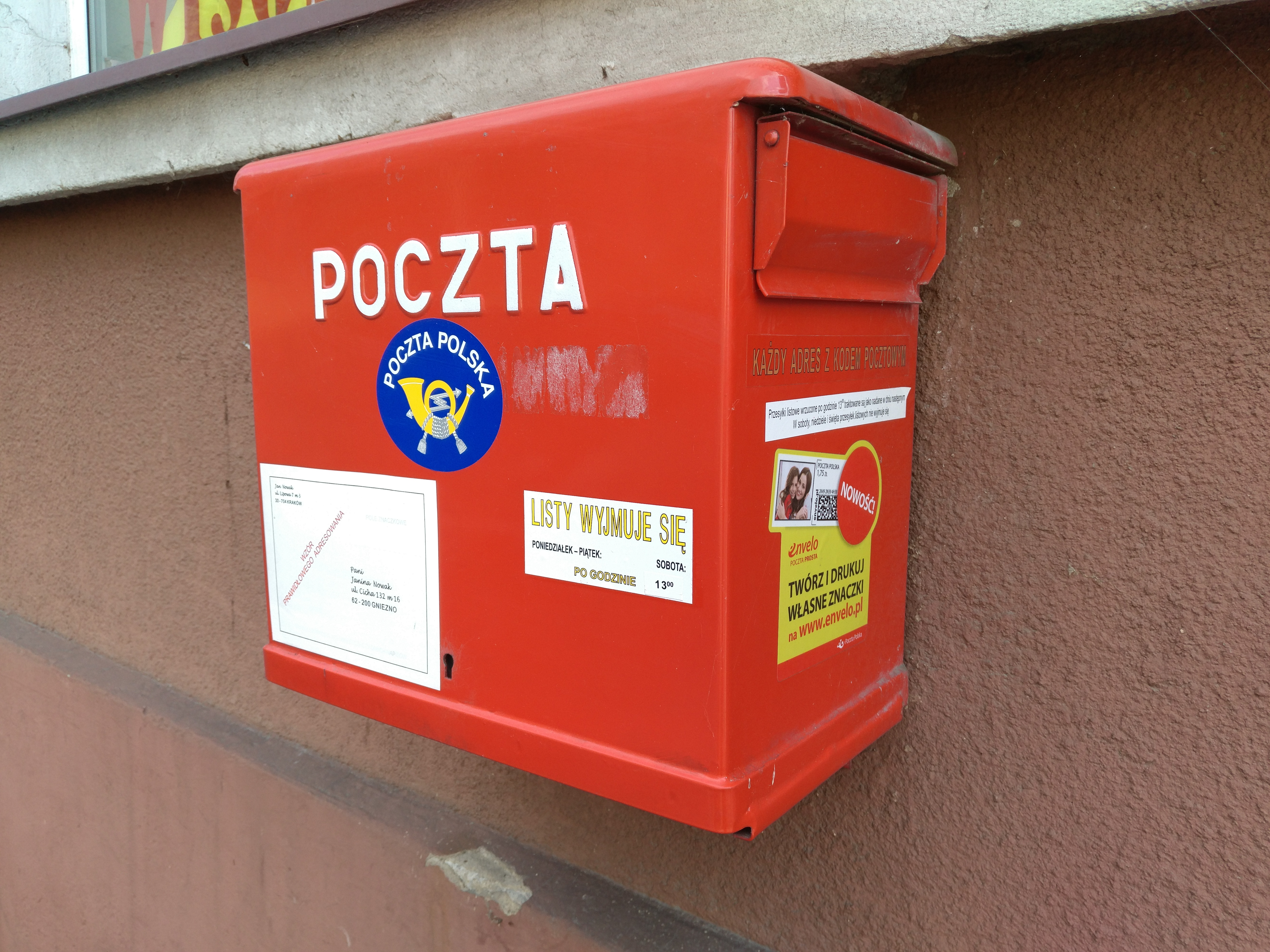
Modern postbox in Poland

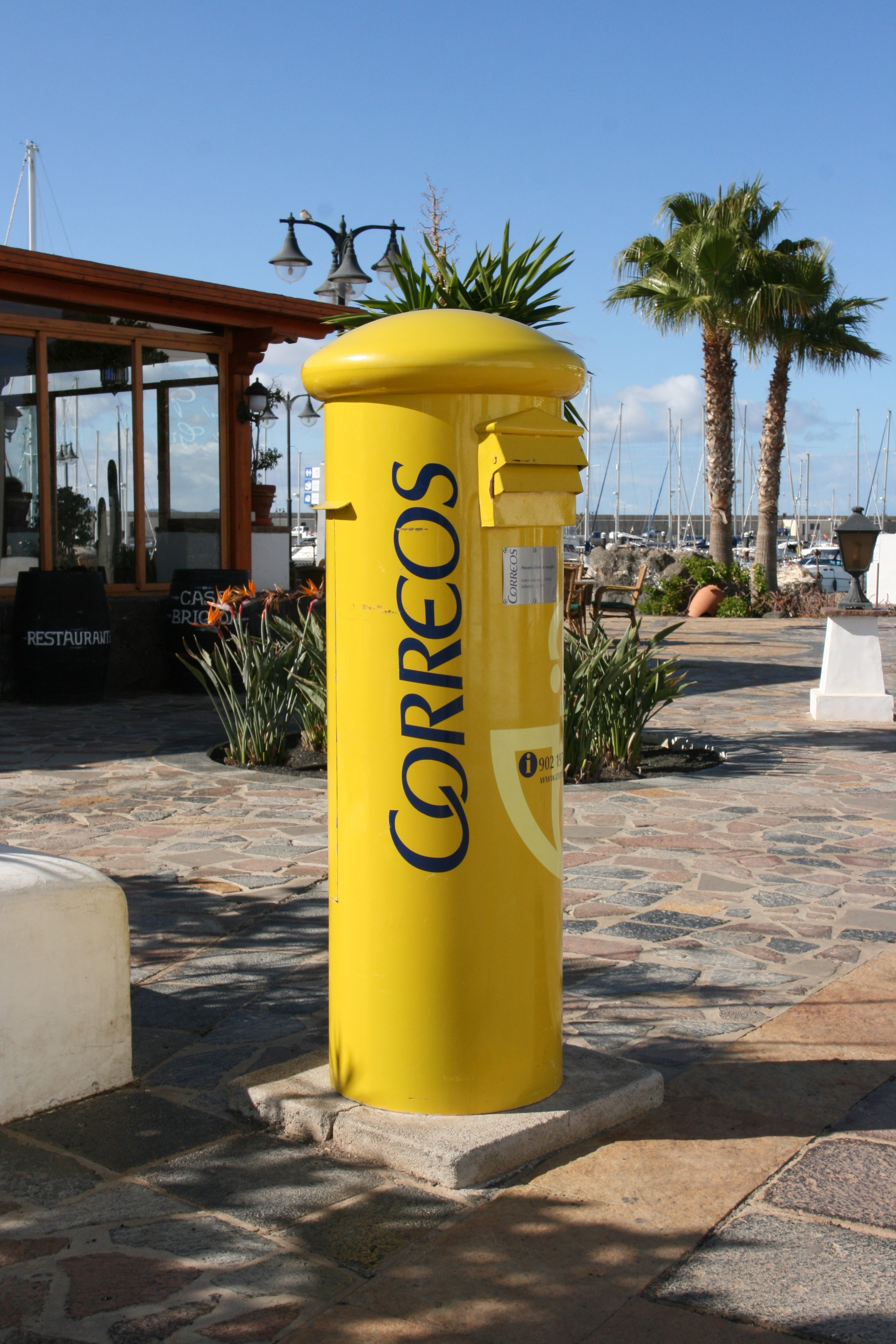
Post box in Lanzarote, (Canary Islands), Spain

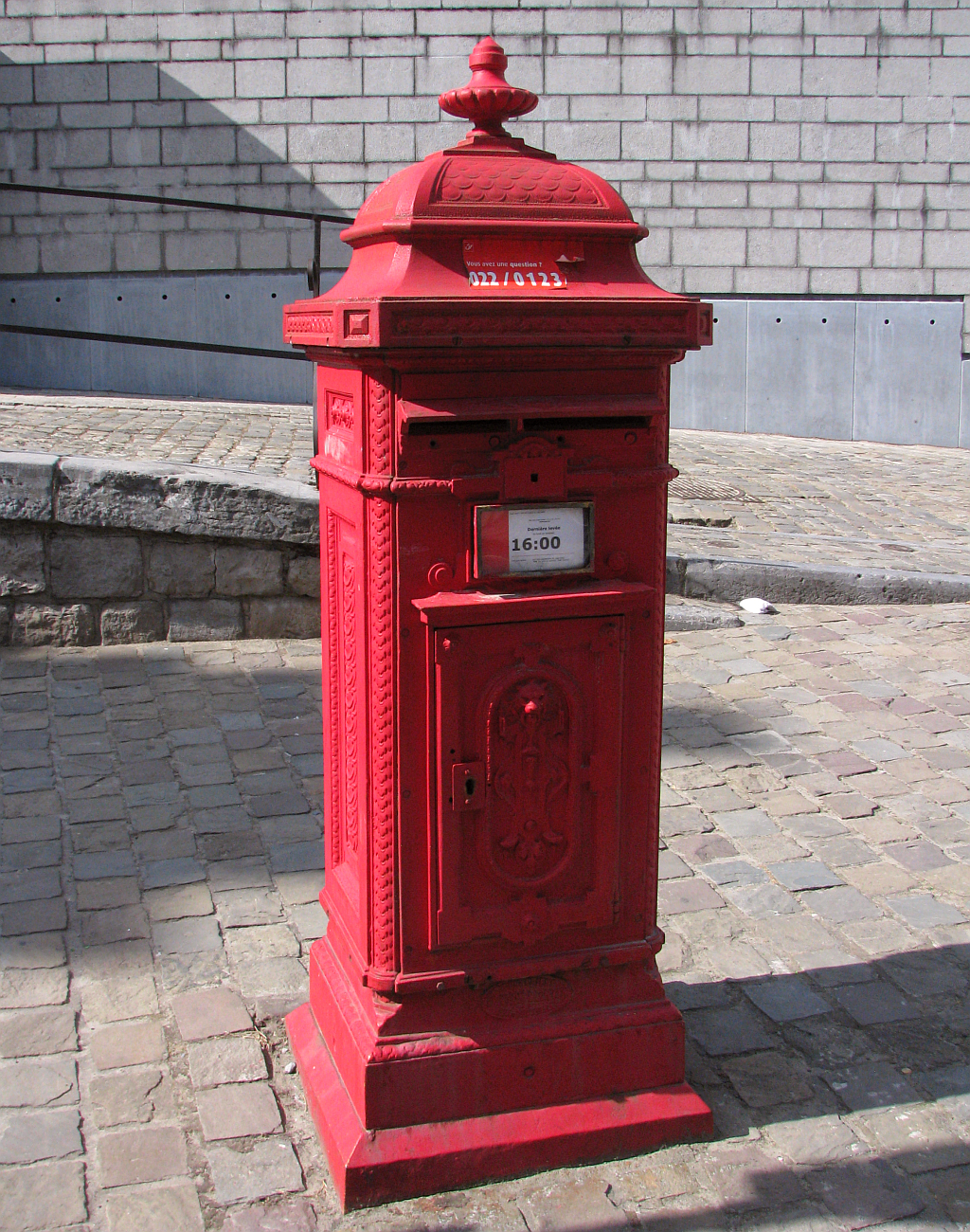
Post box in Belgium

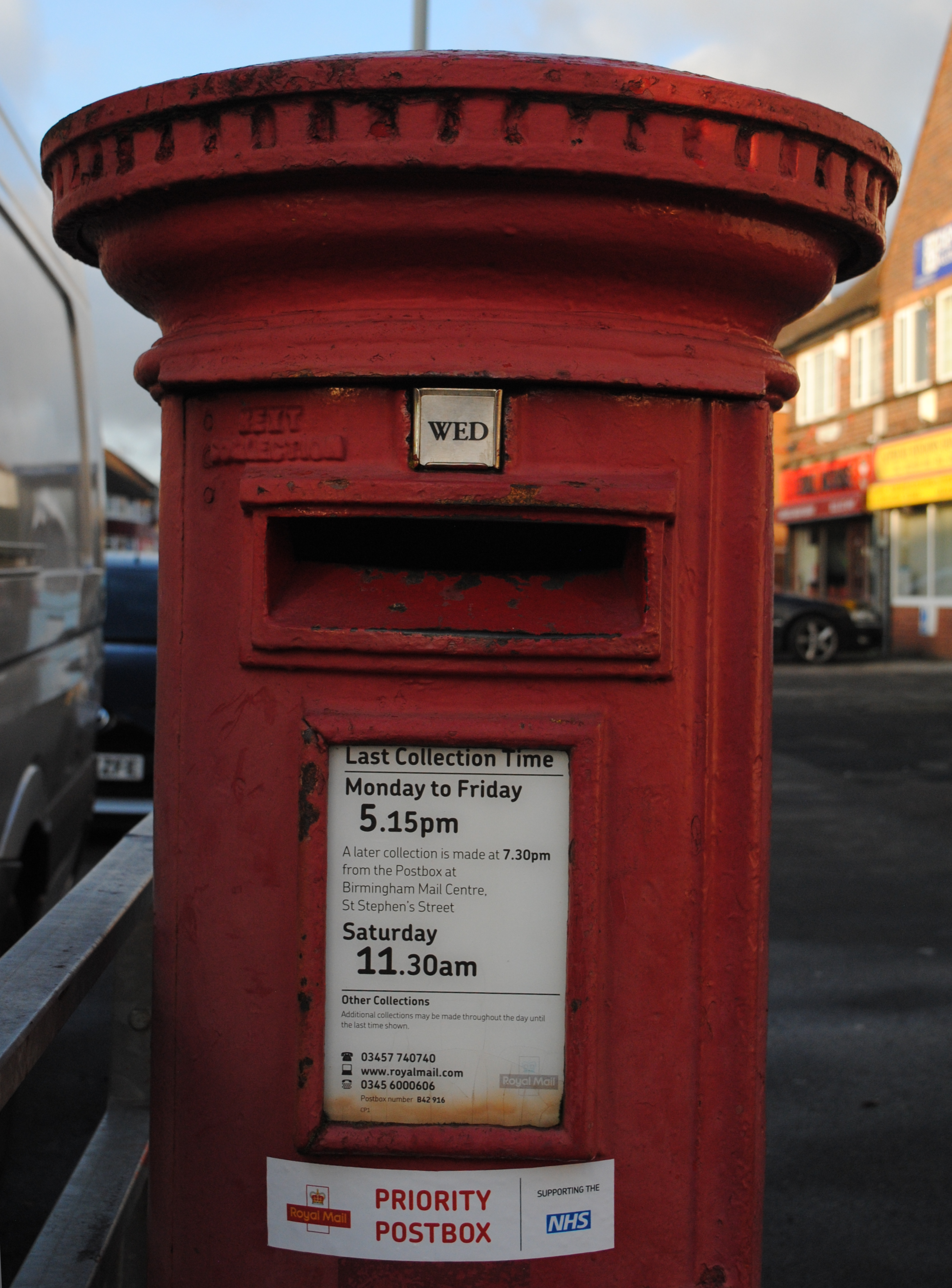
"Priority Postbox", designated for returning COVID-19 home testing kits, Birmingham, England, November 2020

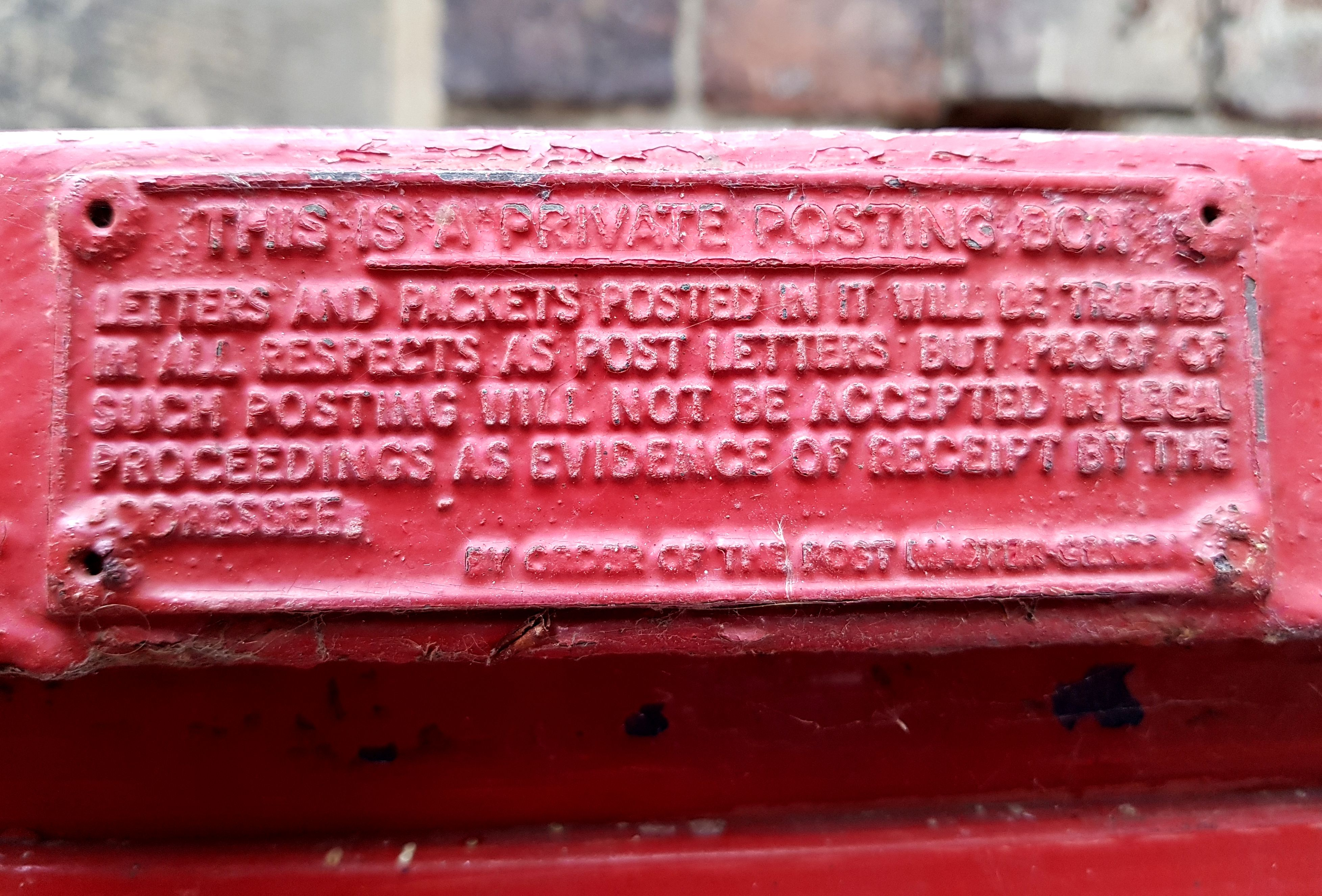
A note attached to an old private posting box in St John University (York)

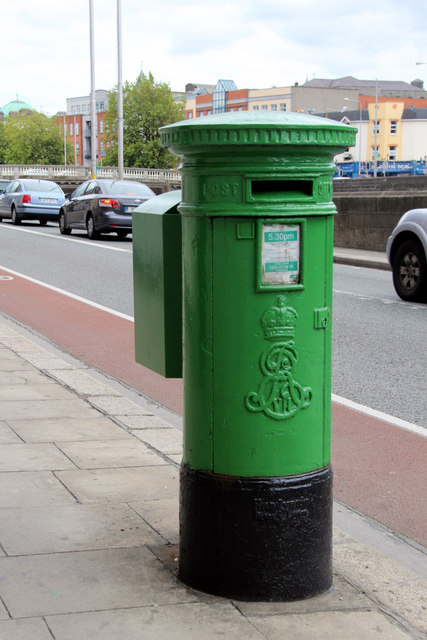
Edward VII Pillar Box, Arran Quay, Dublin. There are old British post boxes from the British era still in used but are painted green.

=== Asia ===
The post box arrived in the late 19th century Hong Kong and were made of wood. In the 1890s, metal pillar box appeared in Hong Kong and remained in use until the late 1990s. From the 1890s to 1997 the boxes were painted red and after 1997 were painted green.

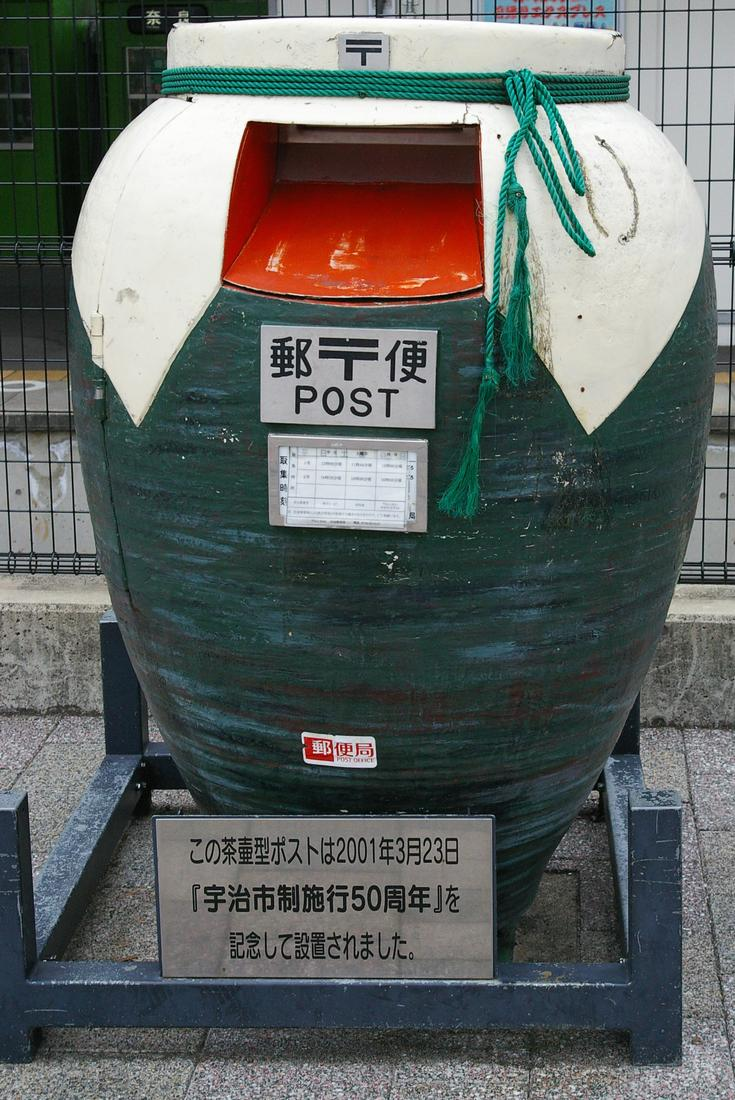
A public (though unconventional) post box in Japan shaped as tea caddy

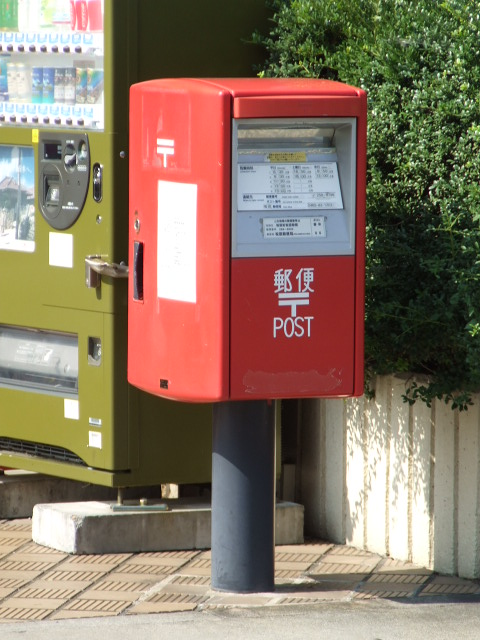
Japanese post box in Matsuda

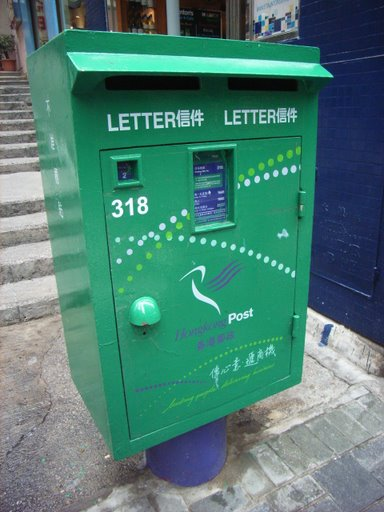
Singapore AA style sheet metal mail box in Hong Kong

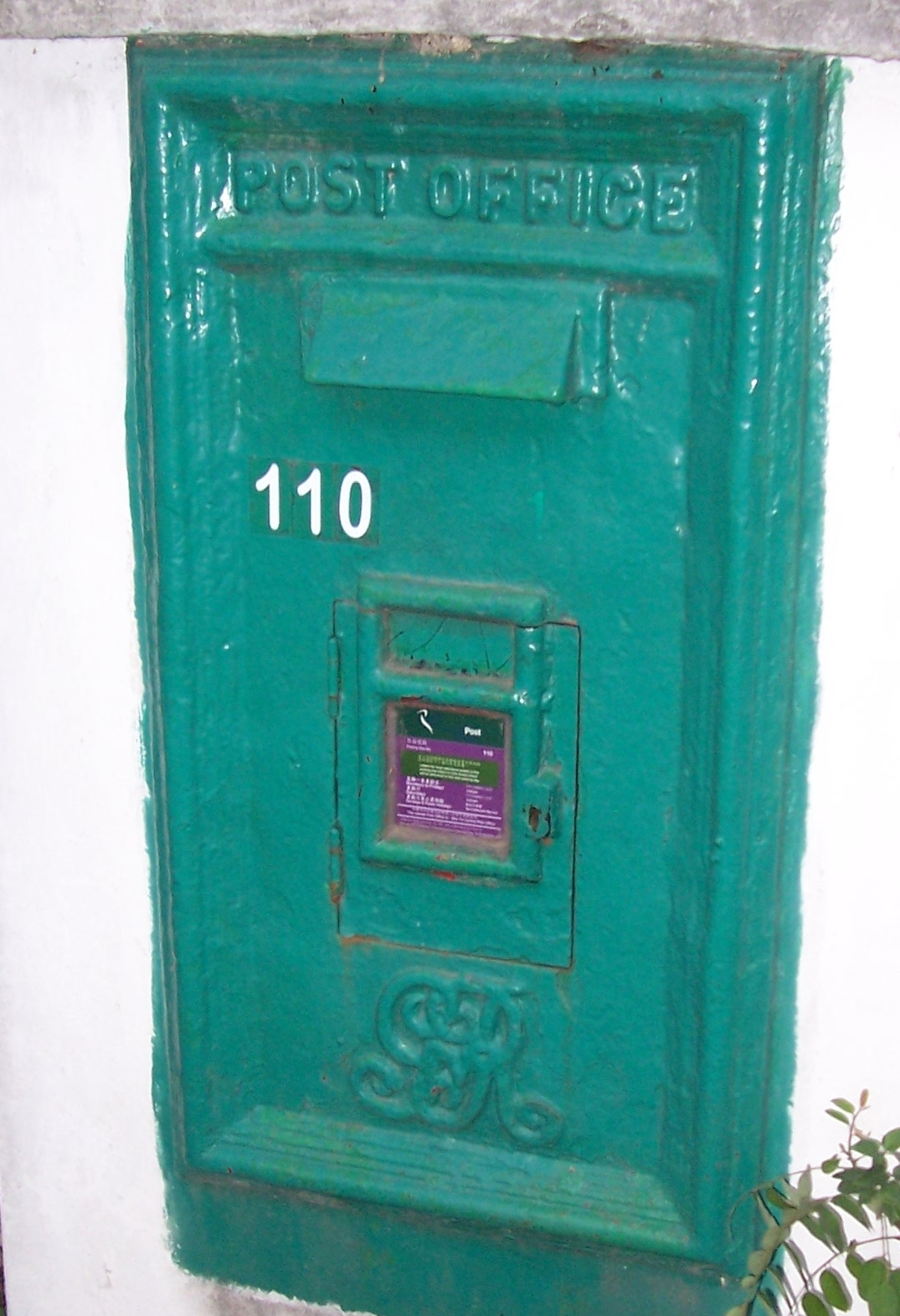
Hong Kong Post box bearing insignia of King George V

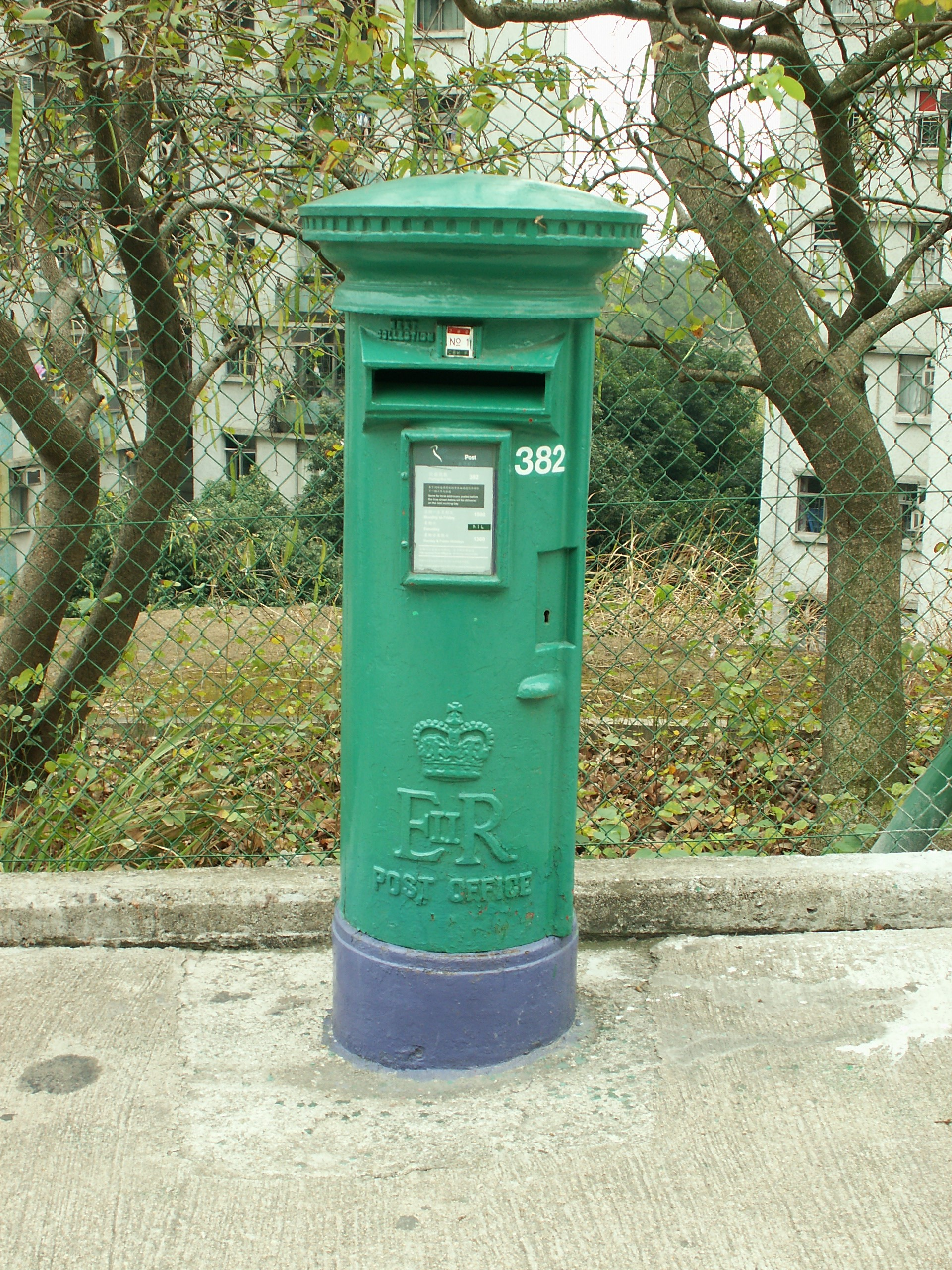
PB27/1 type post box in Hong Kong with "EIIR" cypher

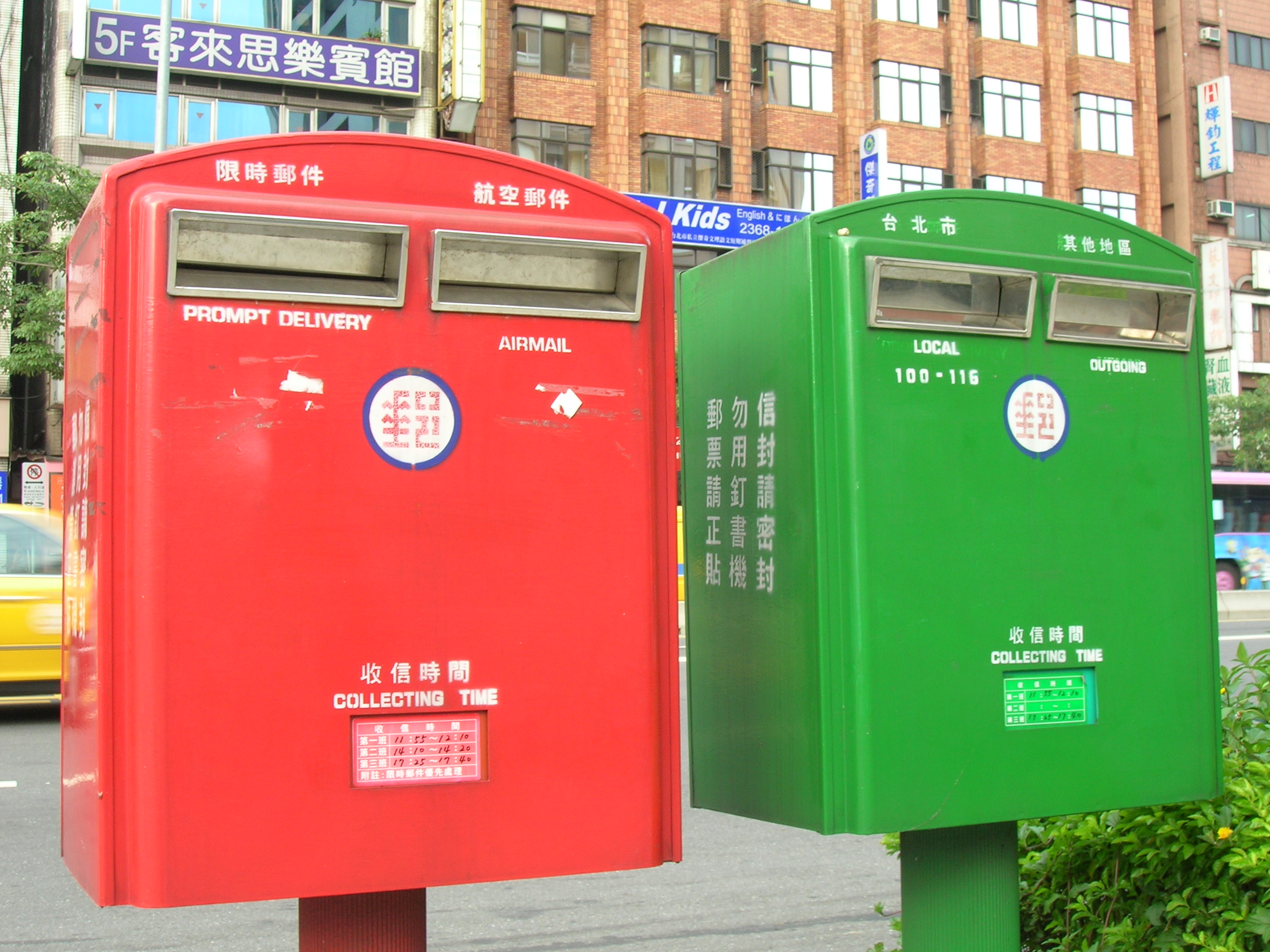
Post boxes in Taipei, Taiwan

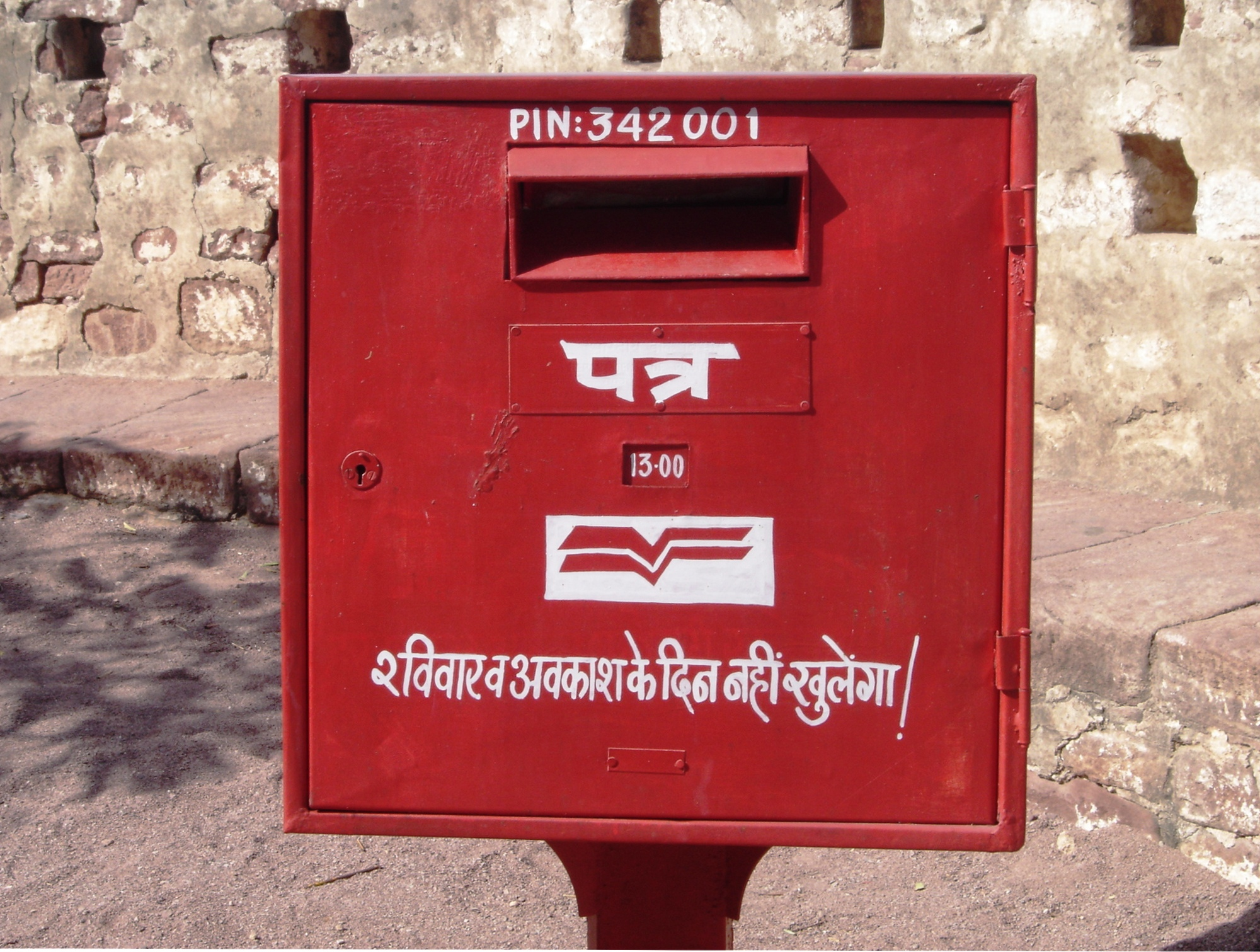
A post box in India

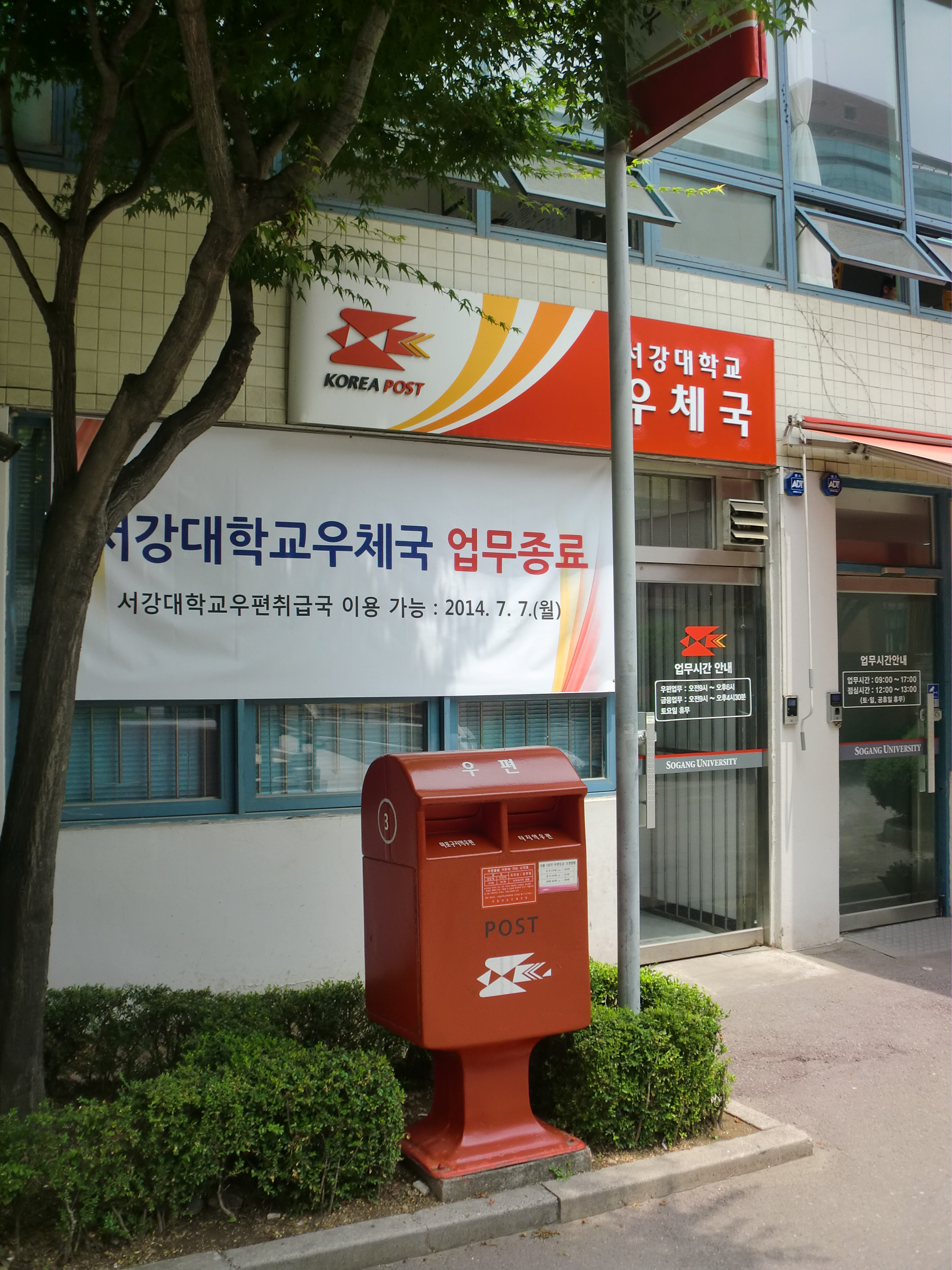
Post box in front of the Songang University Post Office in Seoul, South Korea.

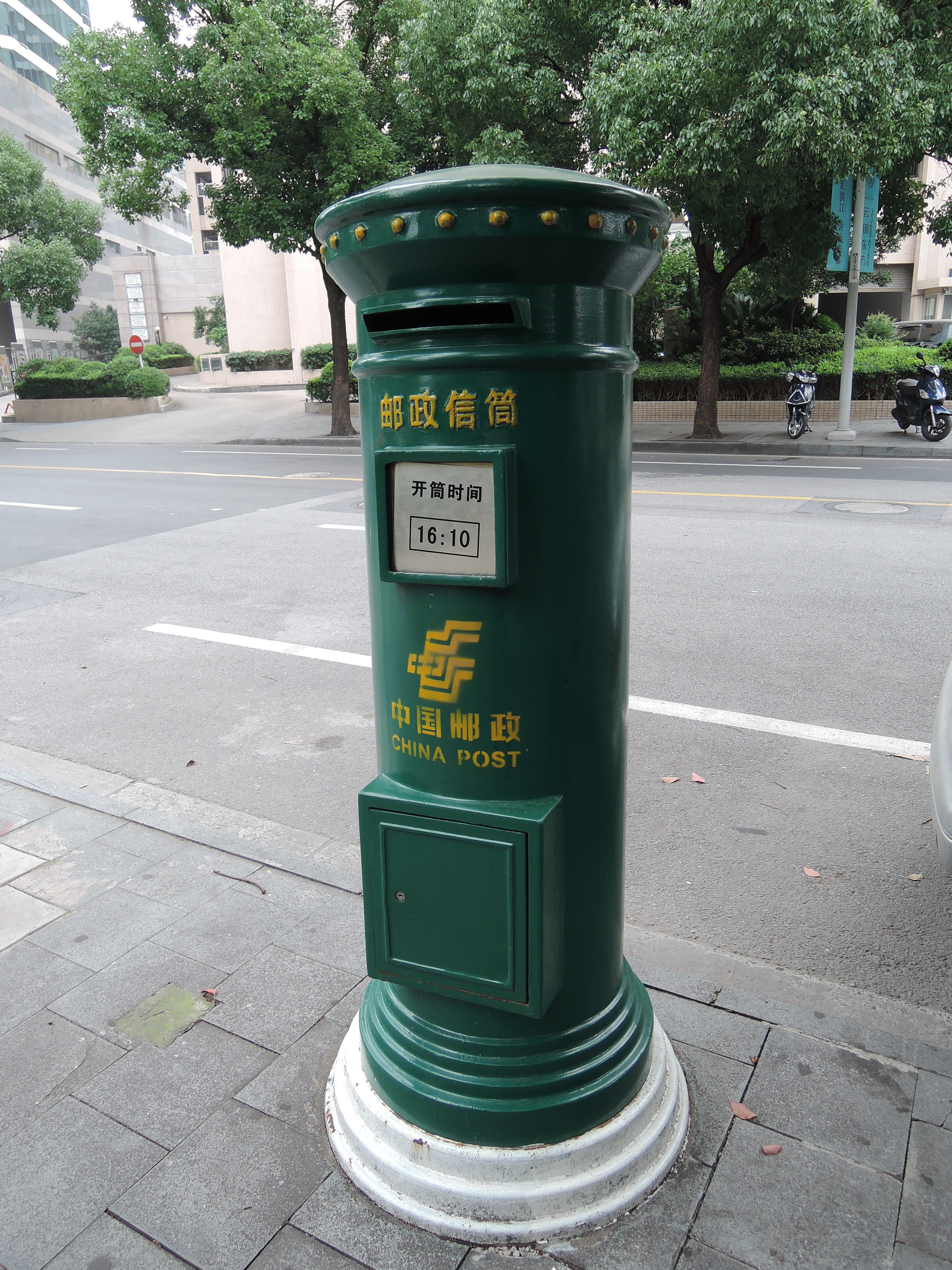
Older British style pillar post boxes still use in the People's Republic of China.

=== North America ===
The United States Post Office Department began installing public mail collection boxes in the 1850s outside post offices and on street corners in large Eastern cities. American collection boxes were initially designed to be hung or supported, and were mounted on support pillars, lamp-posts, telegraph poles, or even the sides of buildings. By the 1880s, these pillar boxes were made of heavy cast iron to deter theft or vandalism. As mail volume grew, the Post Office Department gradually replaced pillar mailboxes with larger free-standing models, though many of the pillar boxes continued in service as late as the 1960s.

The four-footed, free-standing U.S. Mail collection box was first suggested in 1894, following the successful use of such designs in Canada, and quickly became a fixture on American city street corners.

Unlike Canadian mailboxes, which were painted red, American mail collection boxes were originally painted in red or green. Beginning in 1909, all mail collection boxes were painted a dark green to avoid confusion with emergency and fire equipment. Dark green gave way to olive drab green after World War I, when the United States Army donated a large supply of olive drab green paint to the Post Office. Olive drab green subsequently became the standard colour for all American mail collection boxes until 1955. On 4 July 1955, Postmaster General Arthur Summerfield announced that the Post Office would begin painting all mail collection boxes in red, white, and blue to make them easily identifiable. Subsequently, the Post Office began painting mail collection boxes in red and blue, with white lettering. In 1971 the United States Postal Service changed mail collection boxes to the current USPS Dark Blue with contrasting lettering.

The coming of the automobile also influenced American mailbox design, and in the late 1930s, an extension chute or "snorkel" to drive-up curbside collection boxes was adopted. Beginning in 2019 in New York City, the United States Postal Service began replacing collection boxes with a new model with a thin slit for the insertion of letters, instead of the former pull-down flap, in order to prevent "fishing" for valuable mail. The new boxes do not have extension chutes, so are harder to use in drive-up locations.

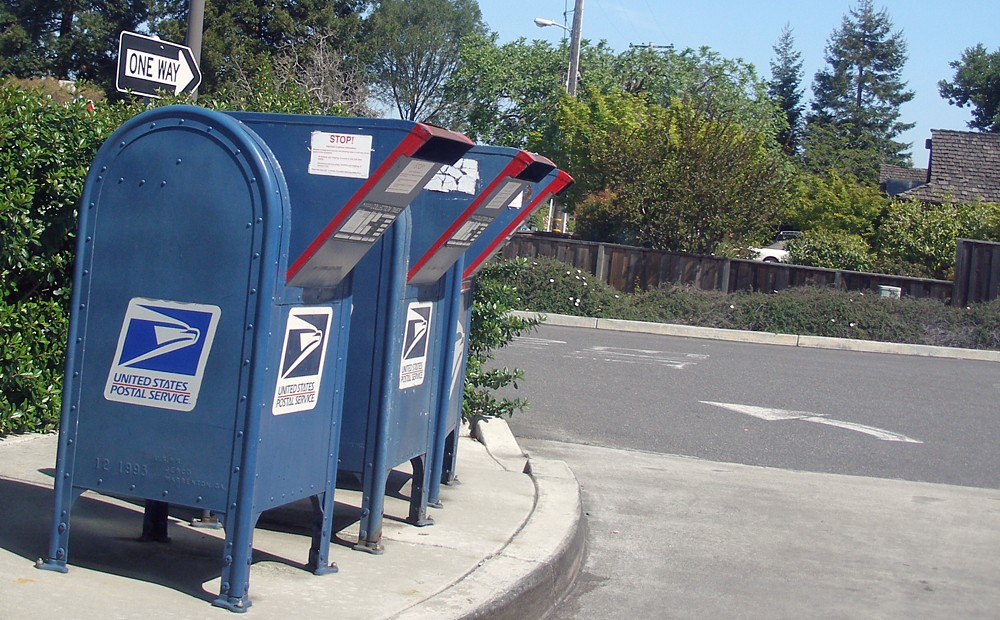
USPS "Snorkel" collection boxes for drive-through access in Los Altos, California

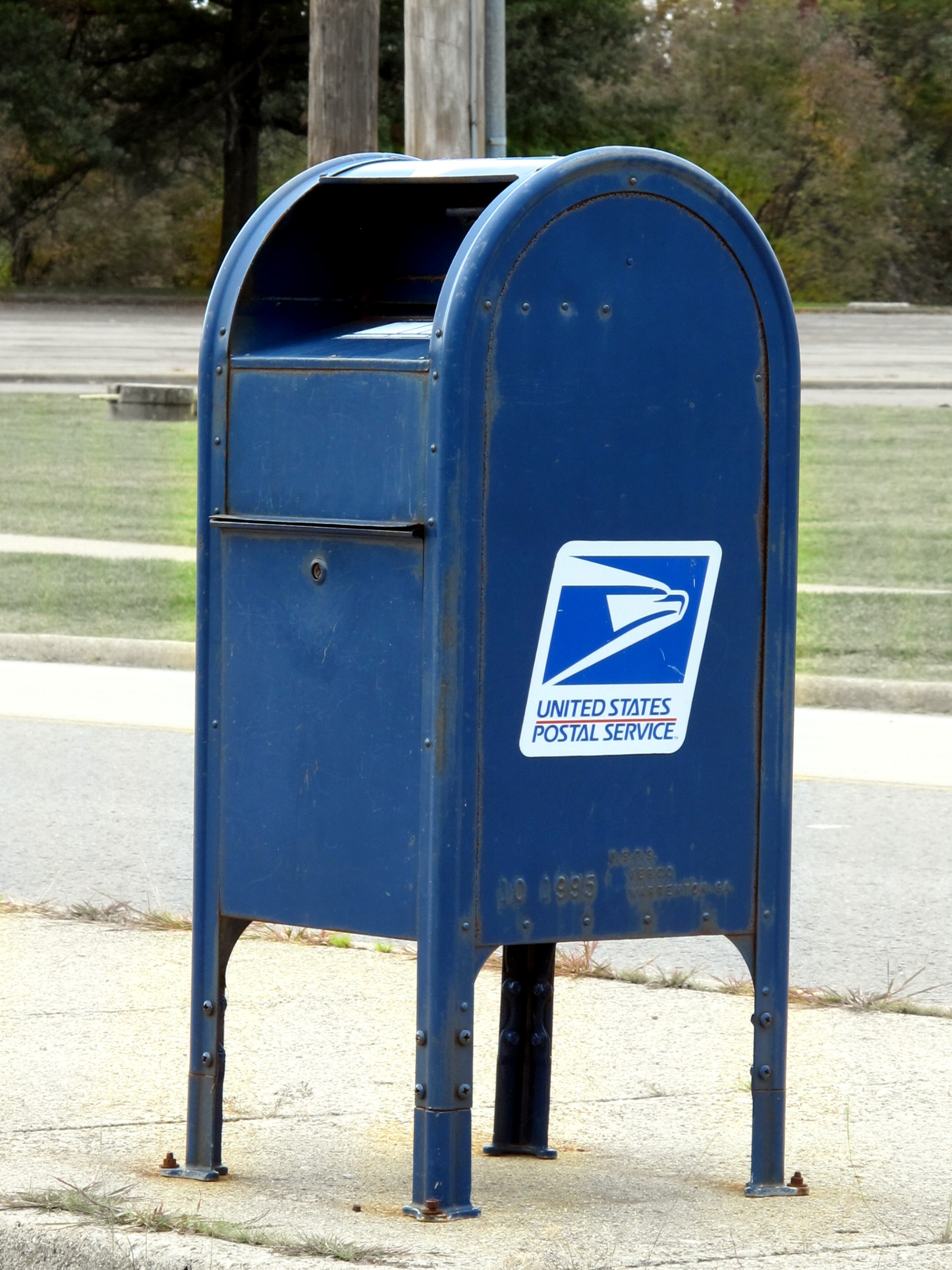
A USPS collection box without a "snorkel"

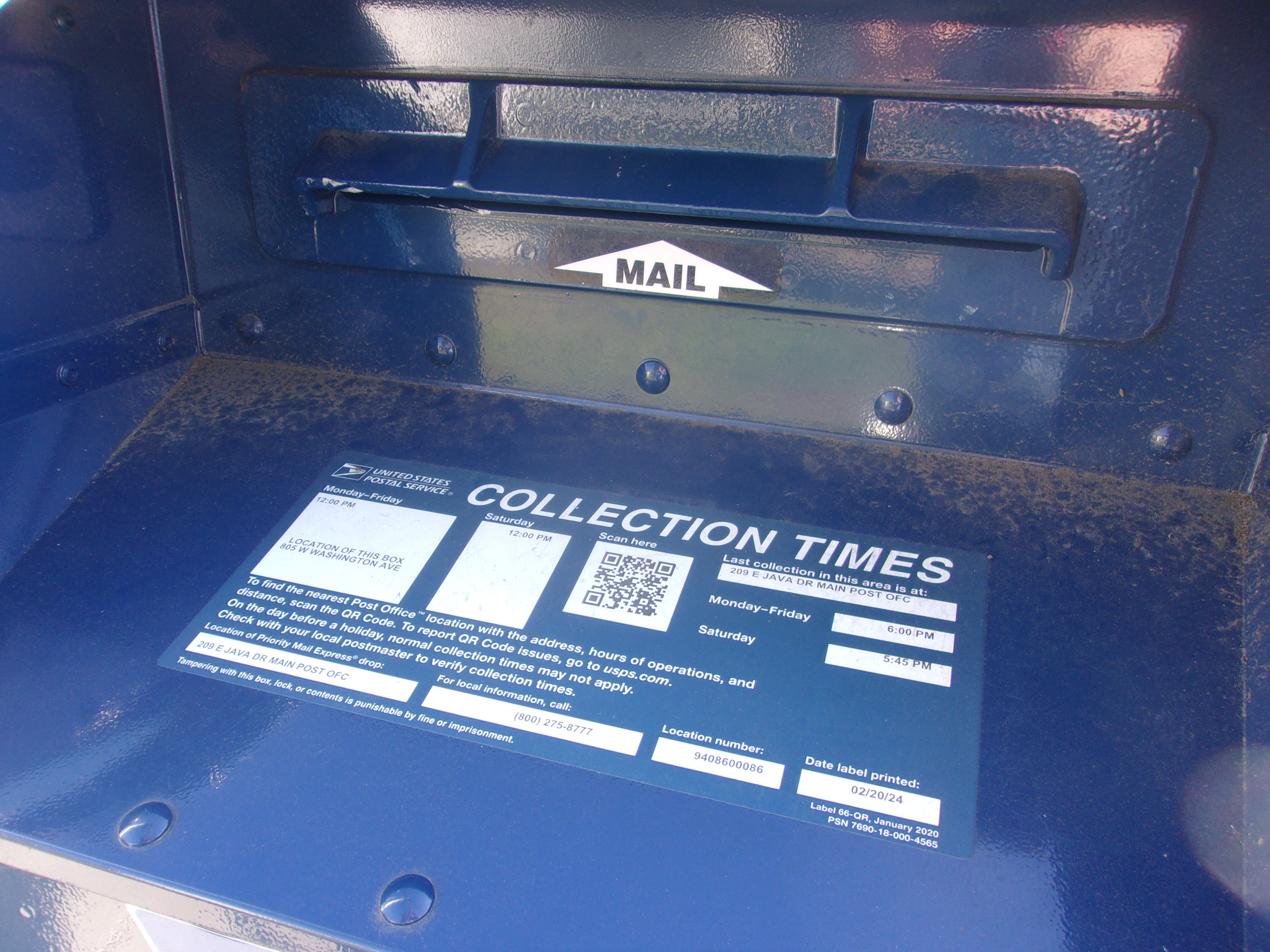
Slit for letters, replacing the flap on a new USPS collection box

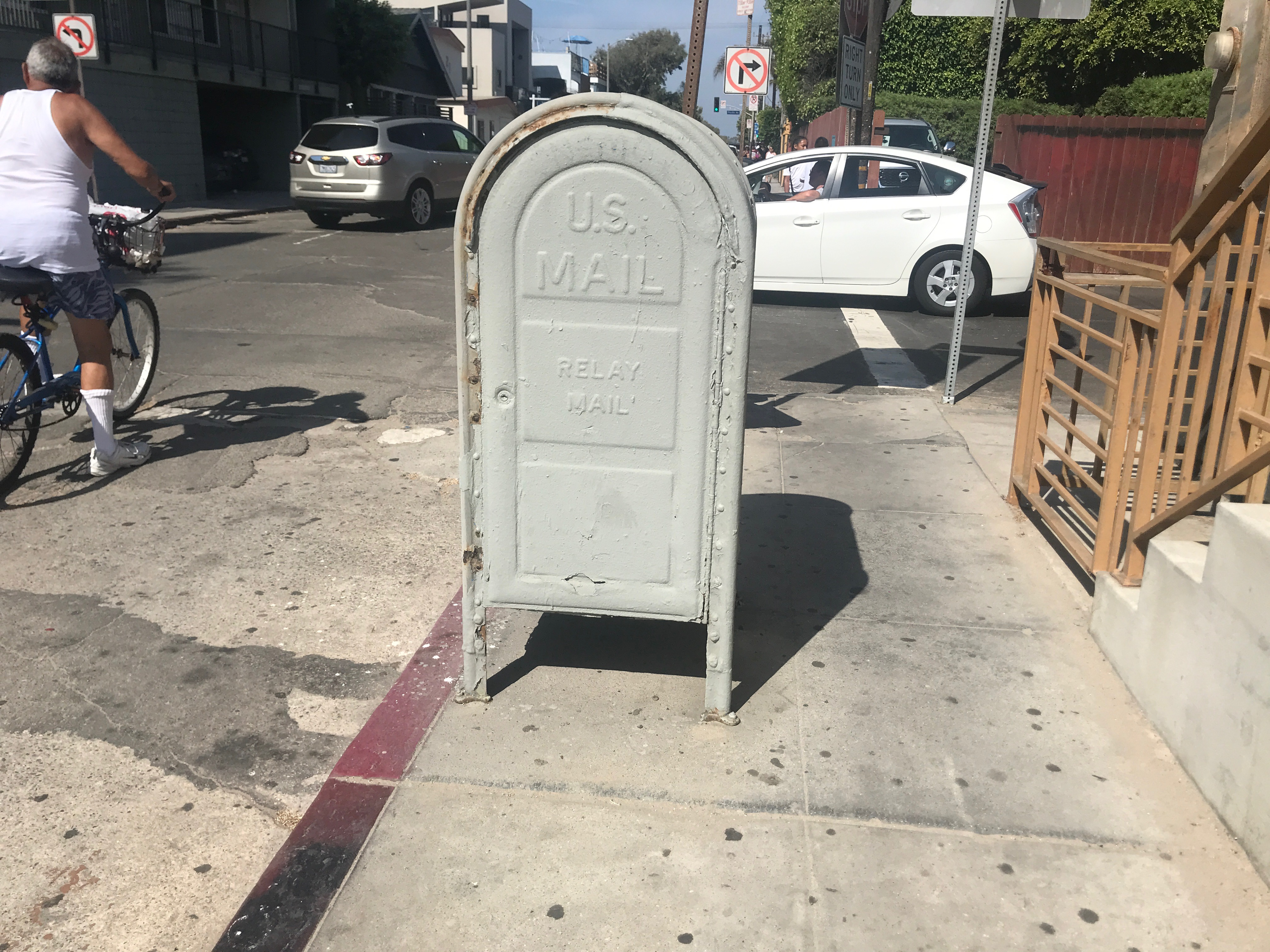
A USPS storage box in Venice, Los Angeles, California, in 2018 with the olive green USPS colouring scheme used between World War I and 1955

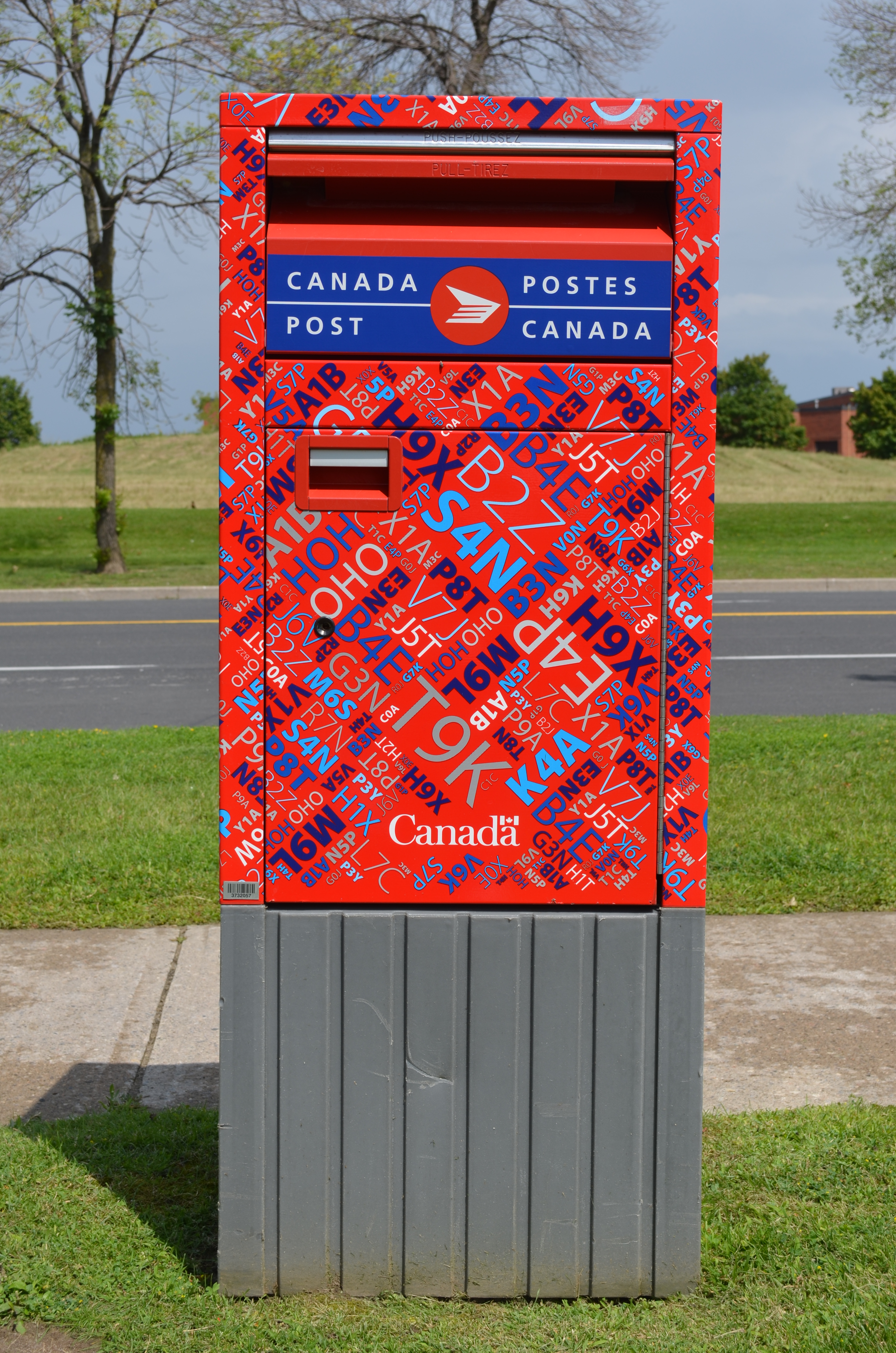
Post box in Markham, Ontario, Canada, decorated with postal codes

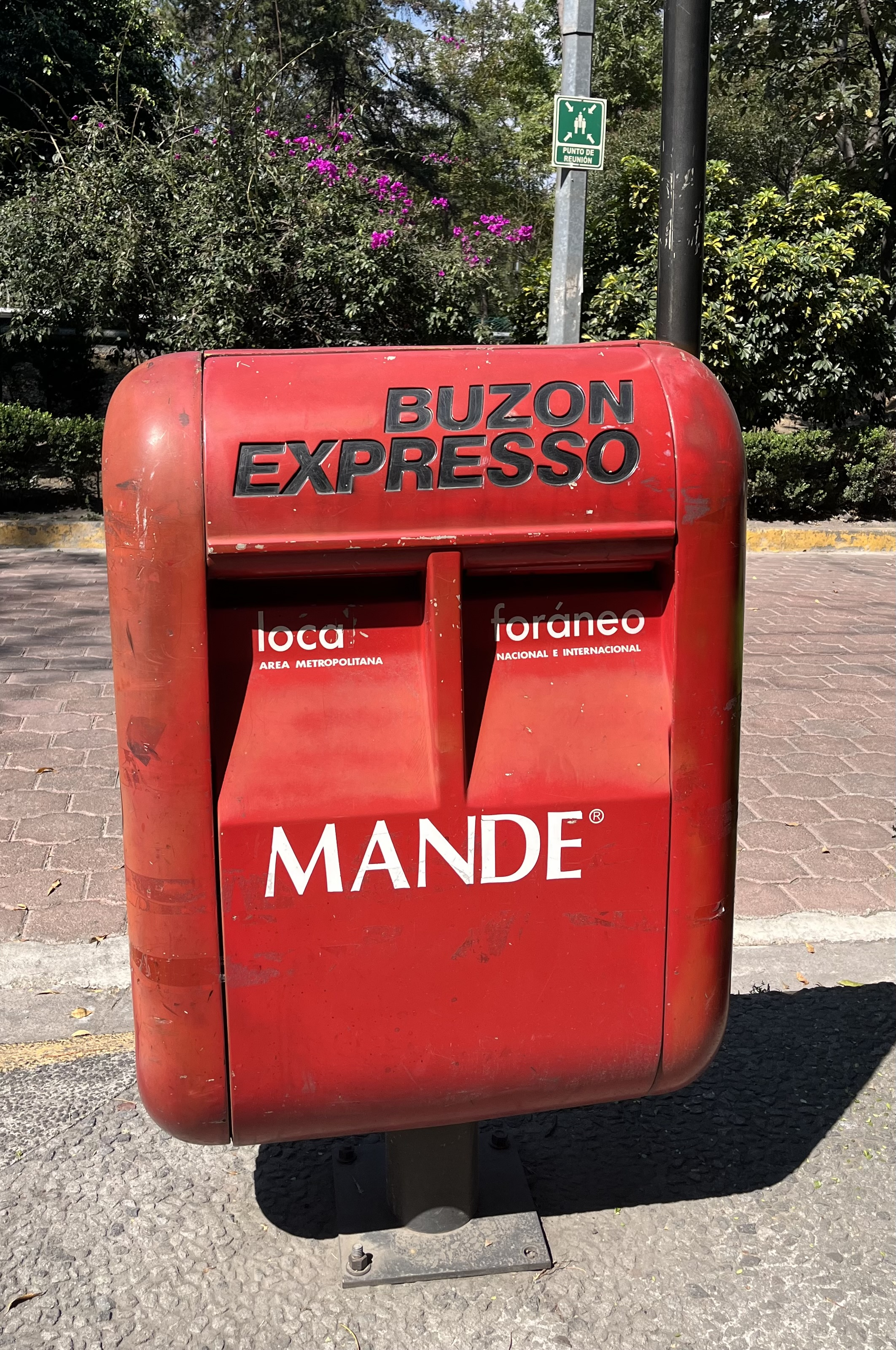
A "Buzón Expresso" collection box in Mexico.

=== Africa ===
In 1500, a Portuguese sea captain named Pêro de Ataíde lost much of his fleet in a storm off the Southern Cape. He wrote a message reporting the damage and a warning relating the state of affairs in India, for future Portuguese captains to avoid Calicut, which was now hostile. Ataíde tucked the message in a boot dangling from a milkwood tree near a spring where sailors often drew water, Aguada de São Brás (Mossel Bay).

Miraculously, the message was retrieved by its intended recipient, João da Nova, admiral of the outgoing 3rd armada, the very next year. The tree became a de facto post office box, where sailors would exchange letters protected in boots, iron pots, or beneath rocks. Seamen would leave their messages behind, trusting that their countrymen would pick them up and deliver them to their correct destination, albeit very slowly.

The Post Office Tree, now believed to be approximately 600 years old, still continues to send and receive mail. A large post office box shaped like a giant boot has been constructed beneath the tree, where people can send letters anywhere in the world and receive a special stamp. Presumably, delivery now takes less than a year.

== Types of post boxes ==
Varieties of post boxes (for outgoing mail) include:

- Lamp box
- Pillar box
- Wall box
- Ludlow style wall box

Some postal operators have different types of post boxes for different types of mail, such as, ordinary post, air mail and express mail, for local addresses (defined by a range of postal codes) and out-of-town addresses, or for post bearing postage stamps and post bearing a postage meter indicator.

Some countries have different coloured post boxes; in countries such as Australia, Portugal, and Russia, the colour indicates which type of mail a box is to be used for, such as 1st and 2nd class post. However, in Germany and parts of Sweden, because of postal deregulation, the different colours are for the different postal services. Other nations use a particular colour to indicate common political or historical ties.

Post boxes or mailboxes located outdoors are designed to keep mail secure and protected from weather. Some boxes have a rounded or slanted top or a down turned entry slot to protect mail from rain or snow. Locks are fitted for security, so mail can be retrieved only by official postal employees, and the box will ordinarily be constructed so as to resist damage from vandalism, forcible entry, or other causes. Bright colours are often used to increase visibility and prevent accidents and injuries. Entry openings are designed to allow the free deposit of mail, yet prevent retrieval via the access slot by unauthorised persons.

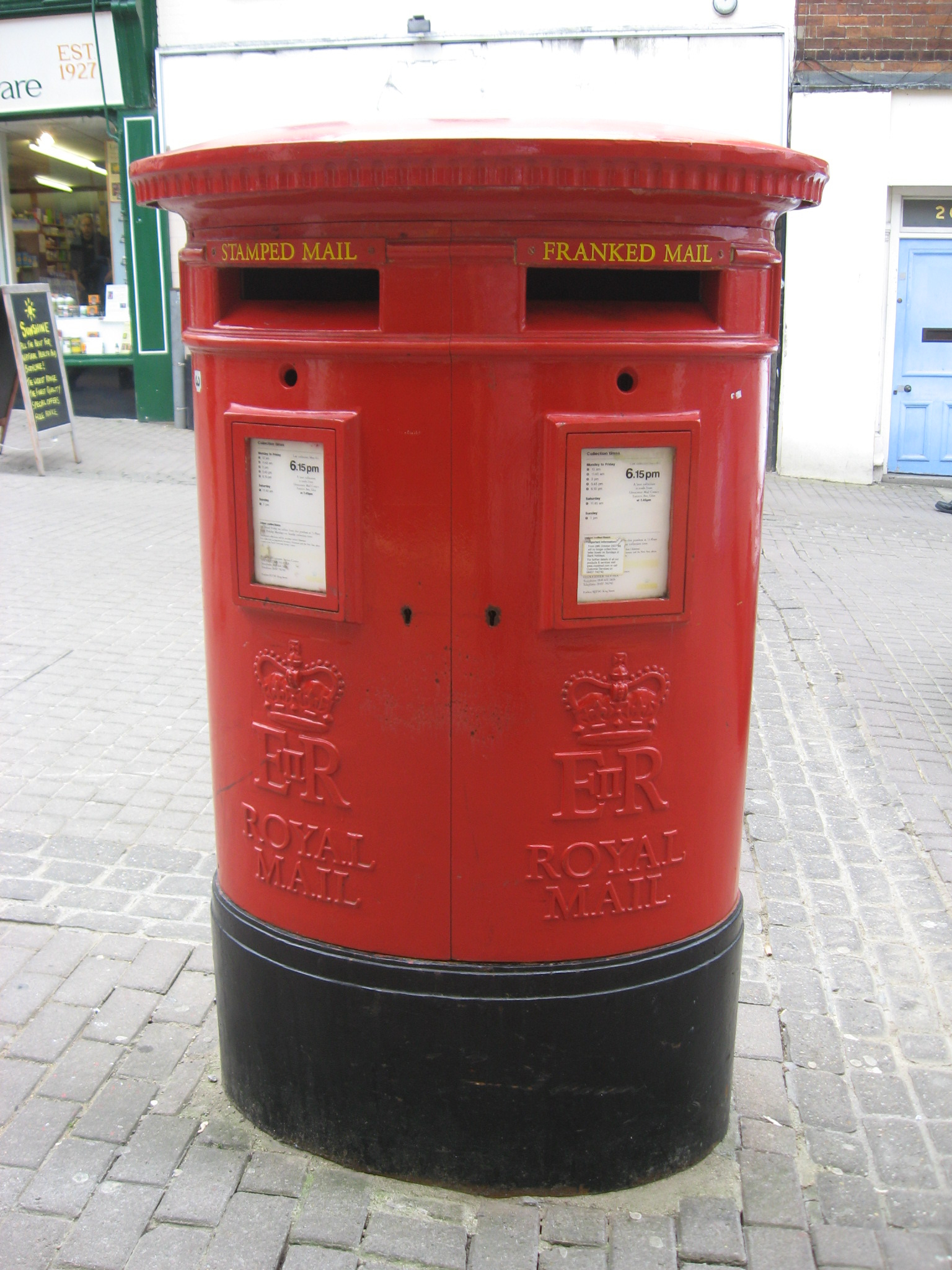
A British pillar box with two apertures, one for stamped, and the other for franked, mail

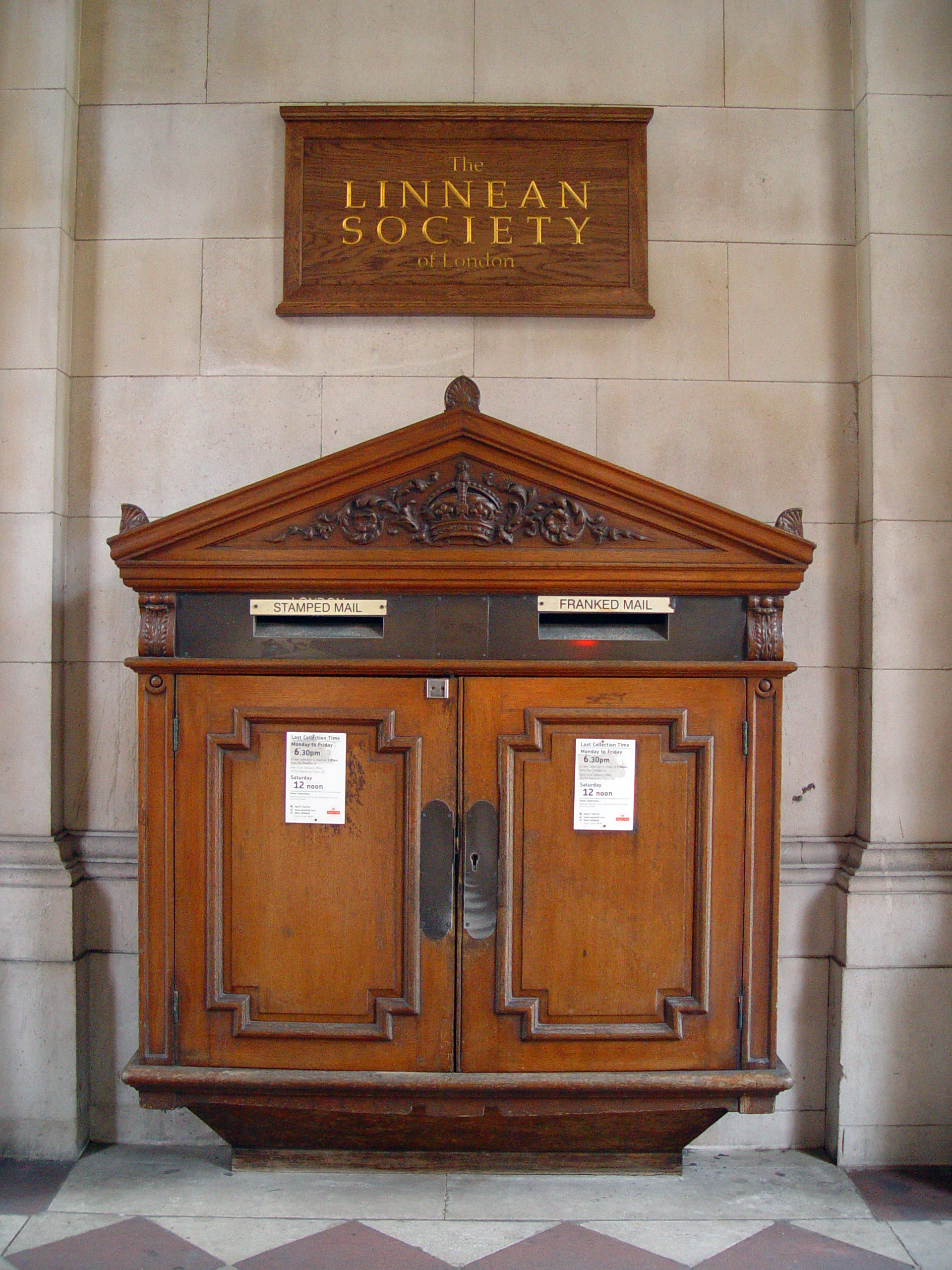
A wooden wall box in Burlington House, London

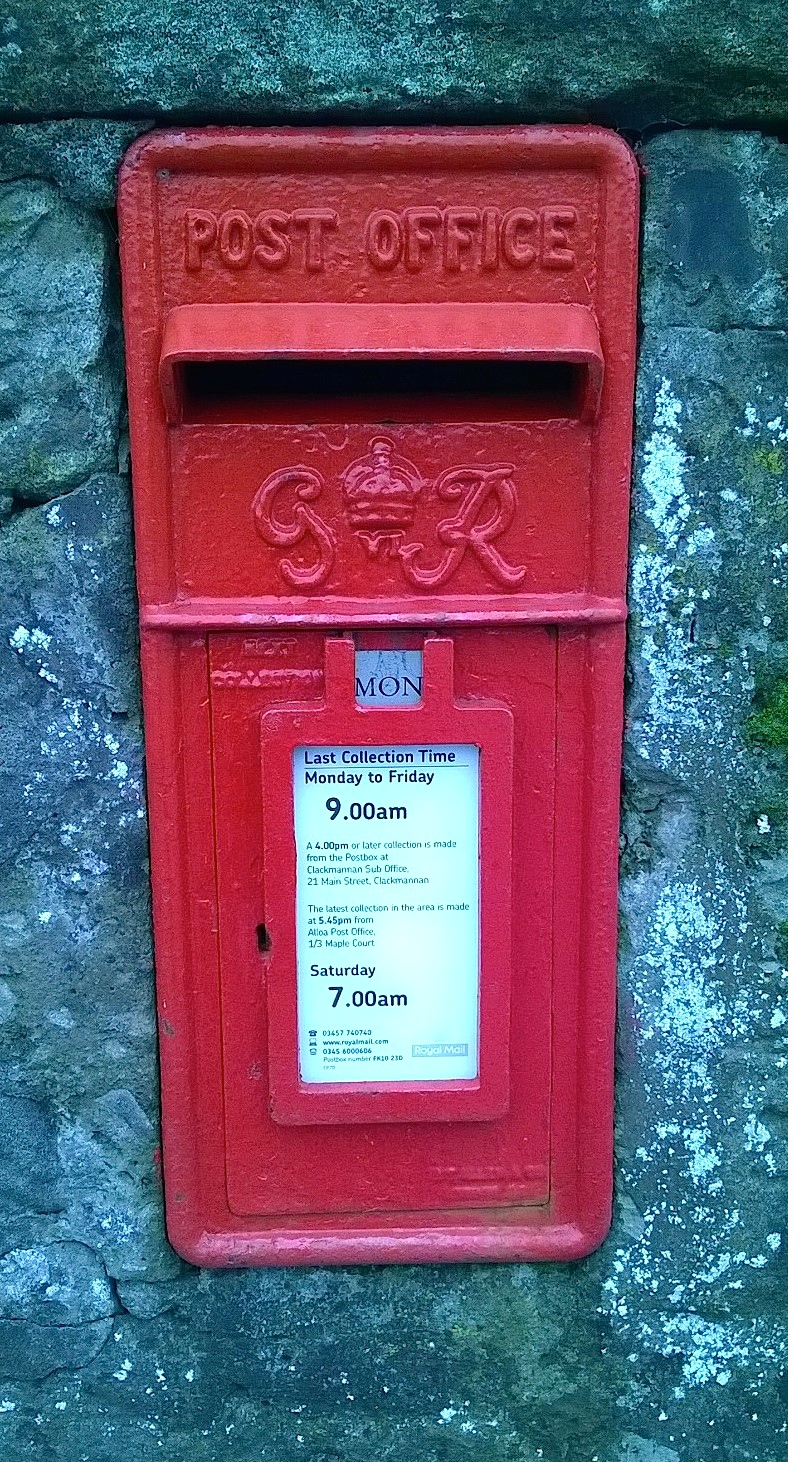
British Royal Mail GR VI Cast Iron Wall Post Box in Clackmannan, Scotland, and still in use

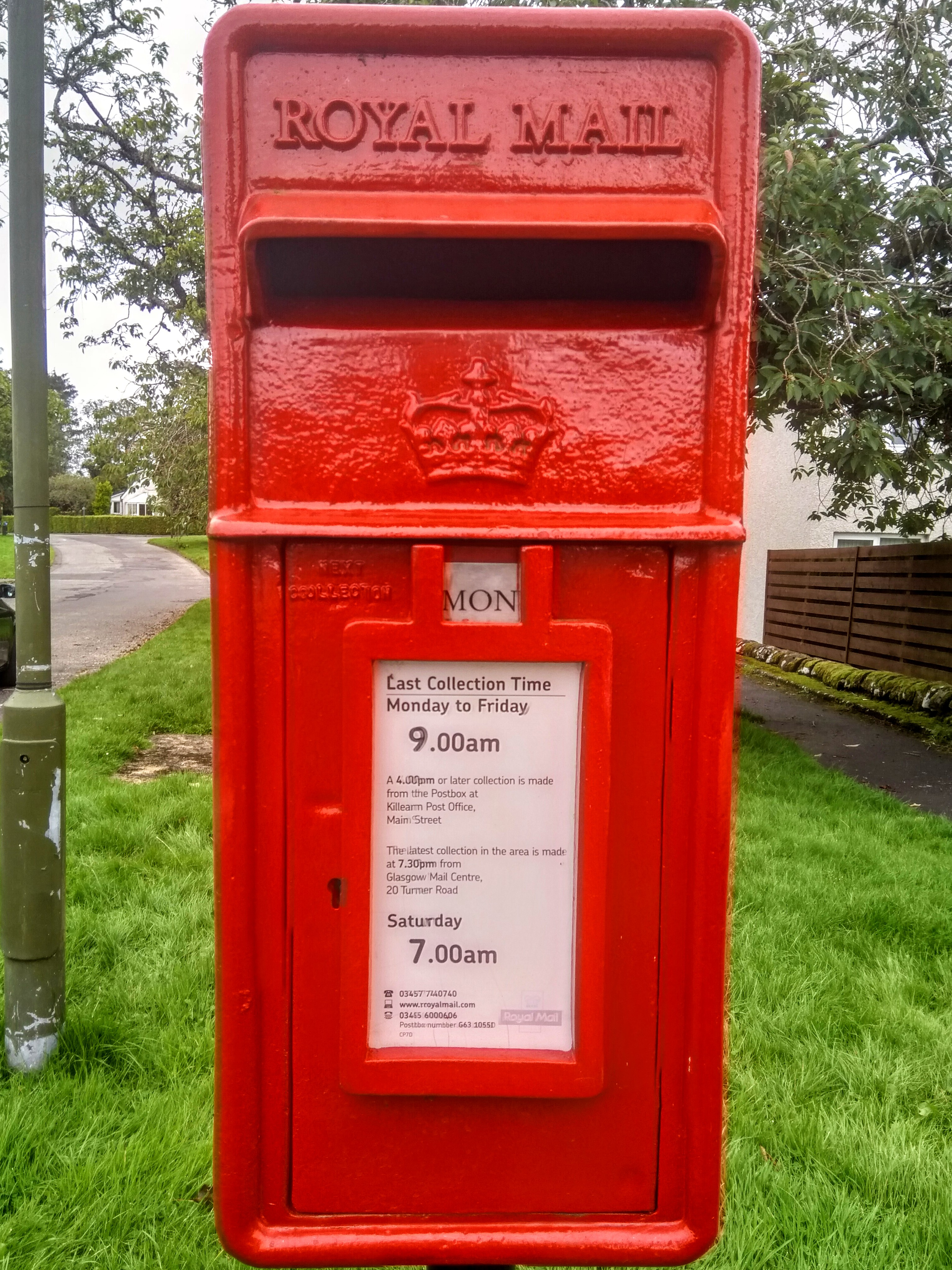
Post-GR VI style of Royal Mail Lamp Box used in Scotland, showing the Crown of Scotland instead of the EIIR cypher

== Clearance ==
Post boxes are emptied ("cleared") at times usually listed on a collection plate fixed to the box. In urban areas, this might be once or twice a day. Busy boxes might be cleared more frequently to avoid overflowing, and also to spread the work for the sorters. Extra clearances are made in the period leading up to Christmas, to prevent boxes becoming clogged with mail.

Since 2005, most Royal Mail post boxes have had the time of only the last collection of the day shown on the box, with no indication of whether the box is cleared at other times earlier in the day. Royal Mail say they needed to increase the type size of the wording on the plate to help those with poor sight, and so there was not enough room to list all collection times throughout the day. Some post boxes may indicate the next collection time by a metal 'tab' or dial that can be changed while the box is open. The tab displays a day or number, each number corresponding to a different time shown on the plate.

Some boxes have been used as a dumping ground for used hypodermic needles. In such cases staff are issued with protective equipment.

== Terrorism and political vandalism ==
=== United Kingdom ===
==== Scotland ====
In 1952, a number of post boxes were attacked in Scotland in a dispute over the regnal number adopted by Queen Elizabeth II, which was displayed as the EIIR cypher. This included at least one damaged in Gilmerton Road, The Inch, Edinburgh by a homemade explosive device. This was because many Scottish people did not believe Queen Elizabeth II should take that title. Rather Elizabeth Queen of Scots as Scotland had never had a Queen Elizabeth before.

Following a civil case in the Scottish courts, a compromise was reached where the Crown of Scotland was placed upon Scottish pillar boxes in place of the St Edward's Crown, without any reference to the particular reigning monarch. To this day Scottish post boxes and Royal Mail vans use the Scottish Crown with no mention of Queen Elizabeth II or King Charles III.

==== The Troubles ====
During 1939 a number of bombs were put in post boxes by the IRA as part of their S-Plan campaign. When the Provisional IRA blew up the Arndale shopping centre in the 1996 Manchester bombing, one of the few things to survive unscathed was a Victorian pillar box dating from 1887 (a type A Jubilee pillar).

In Northern Ireland several red Royal Mail post boxes were painted green by Irish Republicans in early 2009, in order to resemble An Post's post boxes in the Republic of Ireland.

=== United States ===
Nearly 7,000 USPS collection boxes were removed following the aftermath of the September 11 attacks and the 2001 anthrax attacks in which letters containing anthrax spores were placed in public collection boxes.

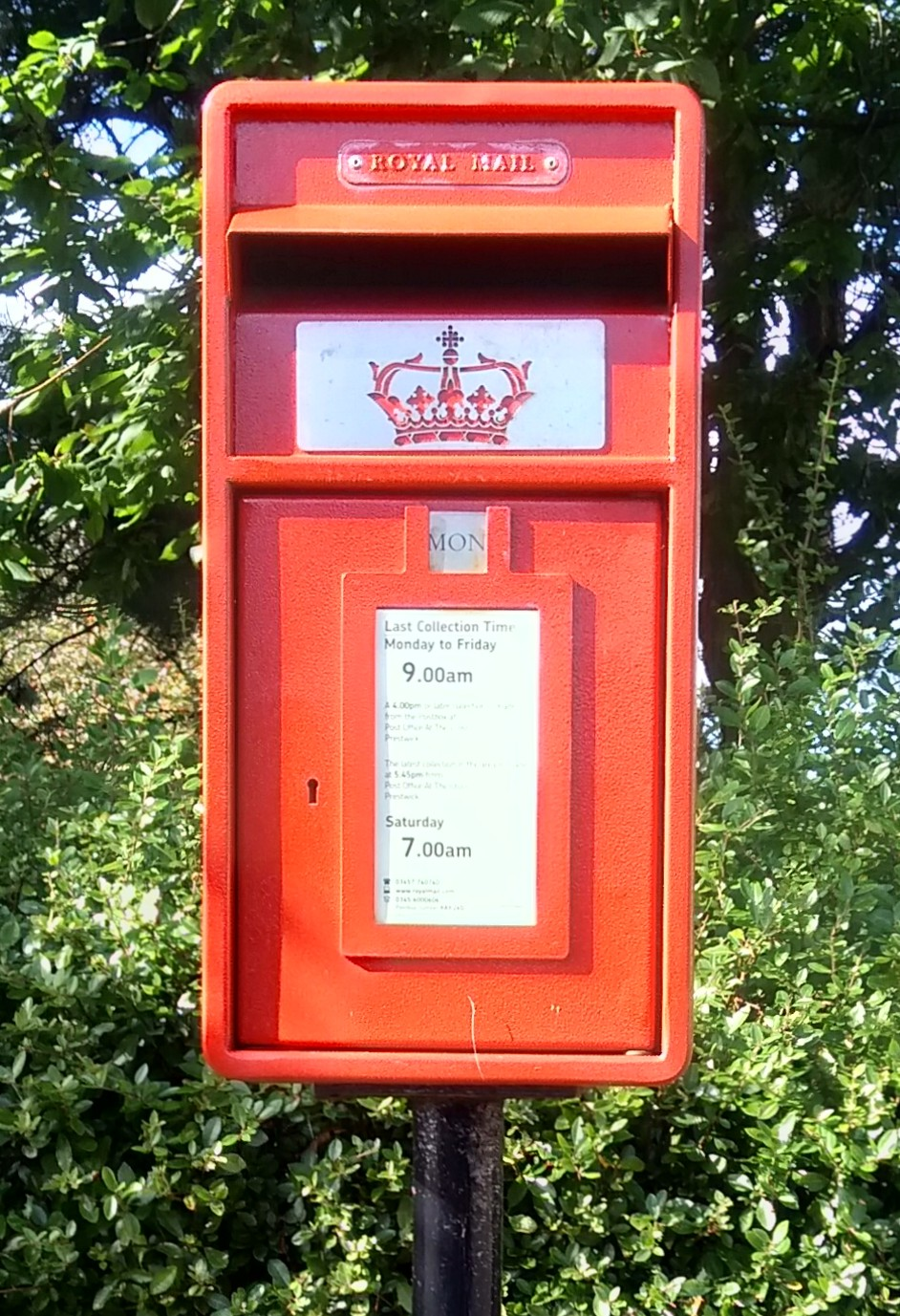
Royal Mail lamp box type LB3426 showing the Crown of Scotland on a steel plate

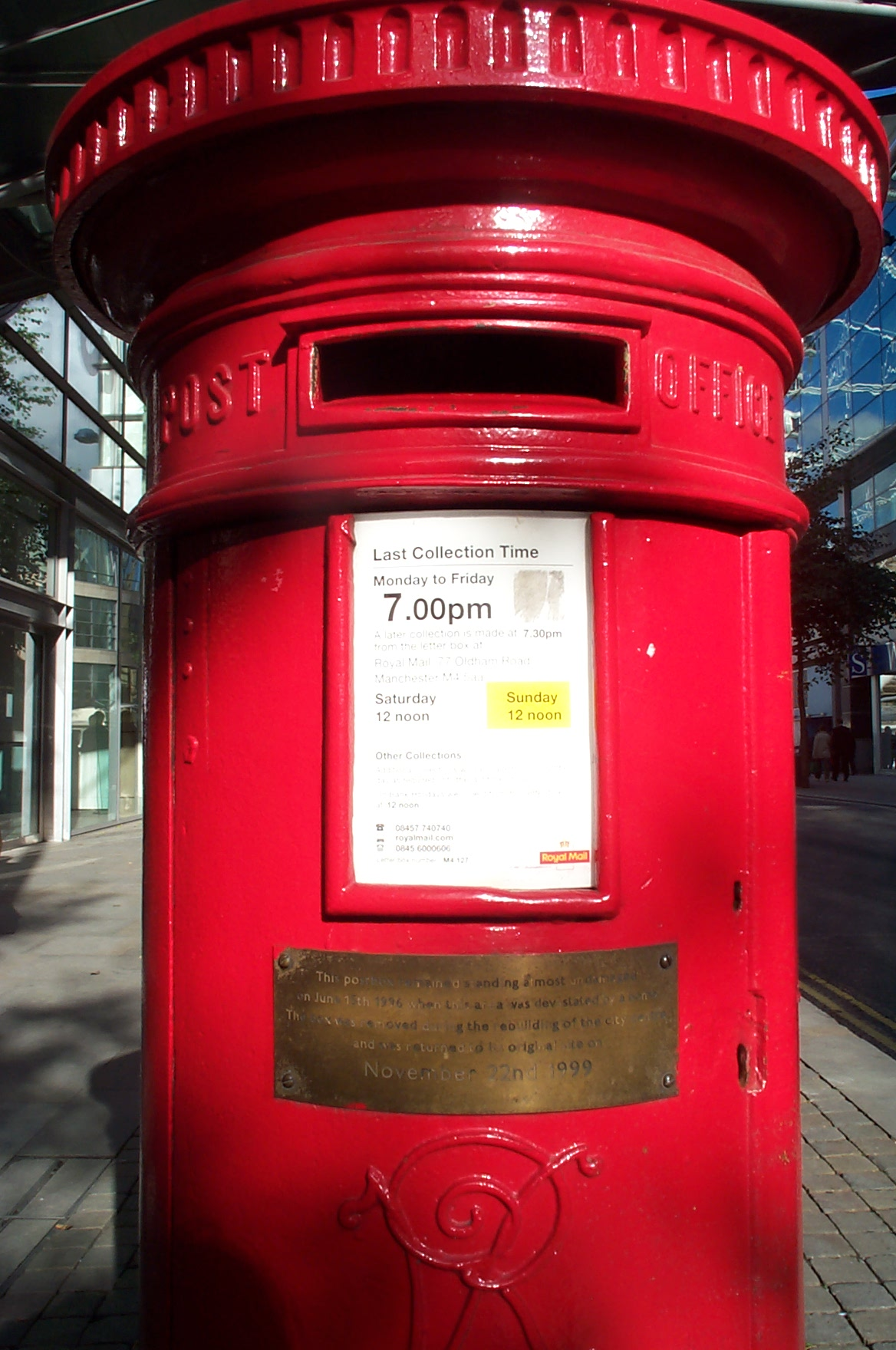
The surviving pillar box from the 1996 Manchester bombing

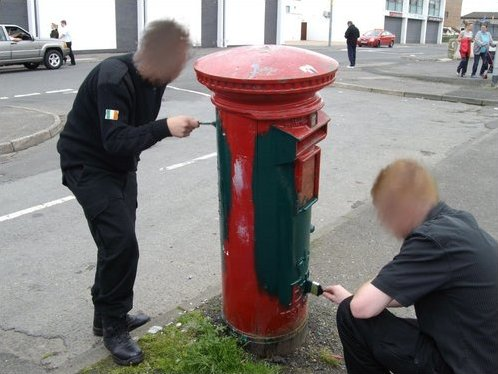
Irish Republicans painting a Royal Mail postbox in Derry for the Green Post-Box Campaign in 2008

=== Colours ===
Colors of post boxes for standard mailings

Red
Argentina, Australia, Bahamas, Barbados, Belgium, Canada, Denmark (until 2026), Gibraltar, Greece (express post), Greenland, Hungary, Iceland, India, Isle of Man, Israel, Italy (domestic post), South Korea, Japan, Jersey, Macau, Malaysia, Malta, Mauritius, Mexico, Monaco, Netherlands – surviving heritage and PTT boxes, New Zealand, Norway (national and international mail), Pakistan, Poland, Portugal, Romania, Spain (express mail), South Africa, Sri Lanka, Taiwan (airmail and prompt delivery), Thailand, Uganda (Posta Uganda), United Kingdom
Yellow
Algeria, Australia (Express Post), Austria, Bosnia-Herzegovina, Brazil, Bulgaria, Croatia, Cyprus (red before 1960), D.R.Congo (scpt), Finland (2nd class), France, Germany (Deutsche Post), Greece (regular and international mail), Iran, Lithuania, Malaysia (Express Post), Montenegro, Morocco, Norway (local mail), Russia (1st Class), Rwanda (iposita), Serbia, Slovakia, Slovenia, Spain (regular mail), Sweden (national and international mail), Switzerland (and Liechtenstein), Tunisia, Turkey, Ukraine, Vatican City, Vietnam
Blue
Belarus, Finland (1st class), Faroe Islands, Germany (many private postal companies), Greenland (since 2021), Guernsey, Alderney, Dominican Republic, Sark, Italy (Air Mail only), United Kingdom (Air Mail – 1933–1940), Portugal (1st Class (Blue Mail) only), Sweden (local mail), Russia, United States
Green
China, Hong Kong (red before 1997), Taiwan (regular mail), Sudan (SudaPost), Republic of Ireland (red before 1922), Some heritage boxes in the United Kingdom, notably Stoke on Trent, Rochester and Scunthorpe
Orange
Czech Republic, Estonia, Indonesia, Netherlands (TNT N.V./PostNL (red before 2006))
White
San Marino, Singapore
Gray
Philippines
Gold
United Kingdom (only for 2012 Summer Olympics and Paralympics gold medal winners)
Black
United Kingdom (only for 2020 Black History Month)

== Symbols ==
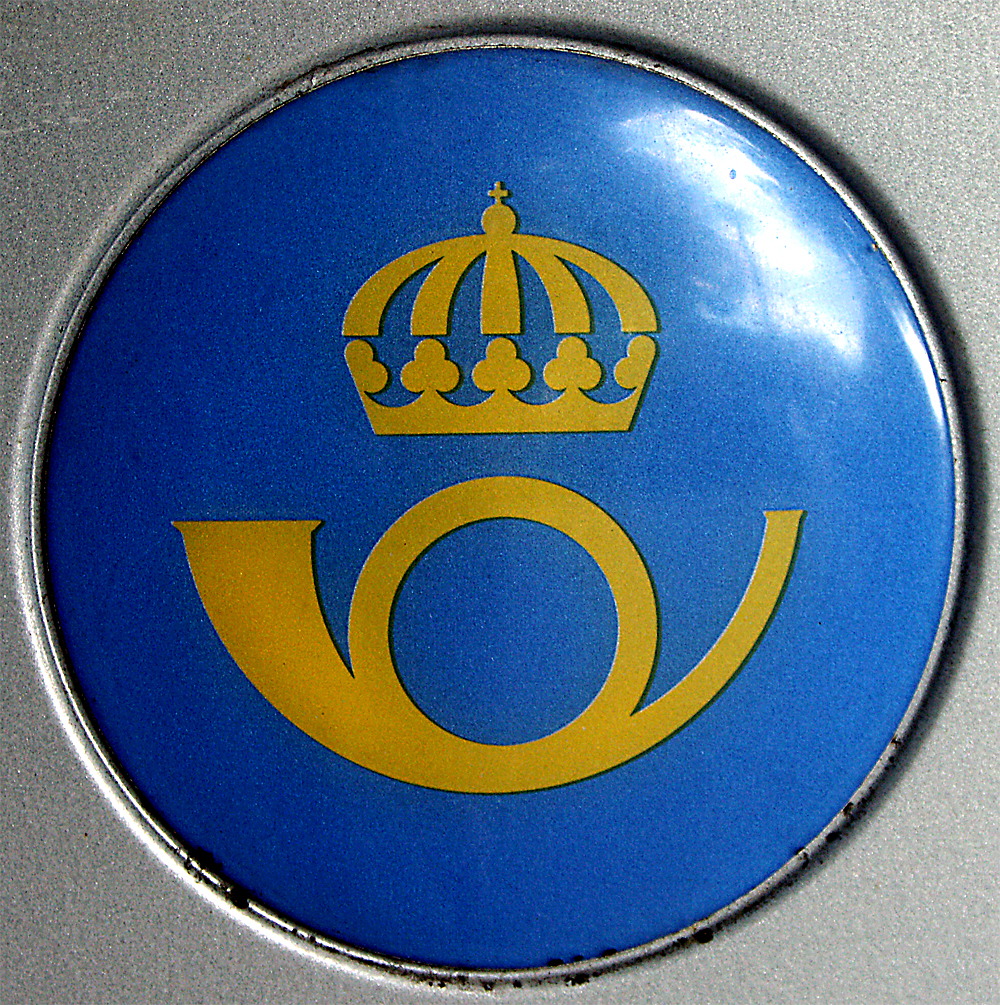
Swedish Royal Post

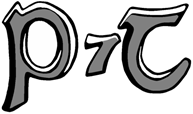
Irish Post & Telegraphs "P&T" logo

- Australia – a styled red letter "P" on a white circle, "P" standing for "Post".
- Canada – a combination of a bird wing and an aircraft wing in a red circle and flanked by the words Canada Post / Postes Canada. Previously the words Canada, Canada Post, or Canada Post Corporation) were used on post boxes. Until the early 1970s, post boxes had the words "Royal Mail" and the Royal Coat of Arms of Canada.
- Continental Europe – most designs include a Post horn, like those used by postmen to announce their arrival. In Germany the post horn is the only element indicating post services.
- France – the arrow-shaped logo of La Poste.
- Greece – Hellenic Post use the head of god Hermes wearing a winged petasos (summer hat) as their logo. Hermes was usually portrayed as the messenger of the gods
- Netherlands – an orange triangle with "postnl" and a royal crown in it.
- Republic of Ireland – from 1922 the Irish harp entwined with the letters "SE" for Saorstát Éireann, then "P⁊T" Gaelic script for Post and Telegraphs and from 1984 An Post with their wavy lines logo, often on the door as a raised casting. Many boxes installed prior to 1922 contain the Royal Cypher of the reigning monarch at the time of manufacture.
- Portugal - logo of the CTT Correios, consisting of a mounted postman playing a post horn.
- Russia – logo of Russian Post (Почта России) written white on blue and black on yellow 1st class mail boxes.
- Spain – Post horn and a royal crown over it.
- Japan – a "T" with bar above it (〒).
- United Kingdom – most post boxes display the Royal Cypher of the reigning monarch at the time of manufacture. Exceptions are the Anonymous pillar boxes of 1879–1887, where the cypher was omitted, and all boxes for use in Scotland manufactured after 1952 (including replicas of the 1866 Penfold design) which show the Crown of Scotland instead of the Royal Cypher for Elizabeth II. Private boxes emptied by Royal Mail do not have to carry a cypher. Royal Mail post boxes manufactured since 1994 carry the wording "Royal Mail", normally above the aperture (lamp boxes) or on the door (pillar boxes). Before this date all post boxes, with the exception of the Anonymous pillar boxes, carried the wording "Post Office".
- United States – the United States Postal Service (USPS) eagle logo, except that boxes for Express Mail use the USPS Express Mail logo.

== Gallery ==
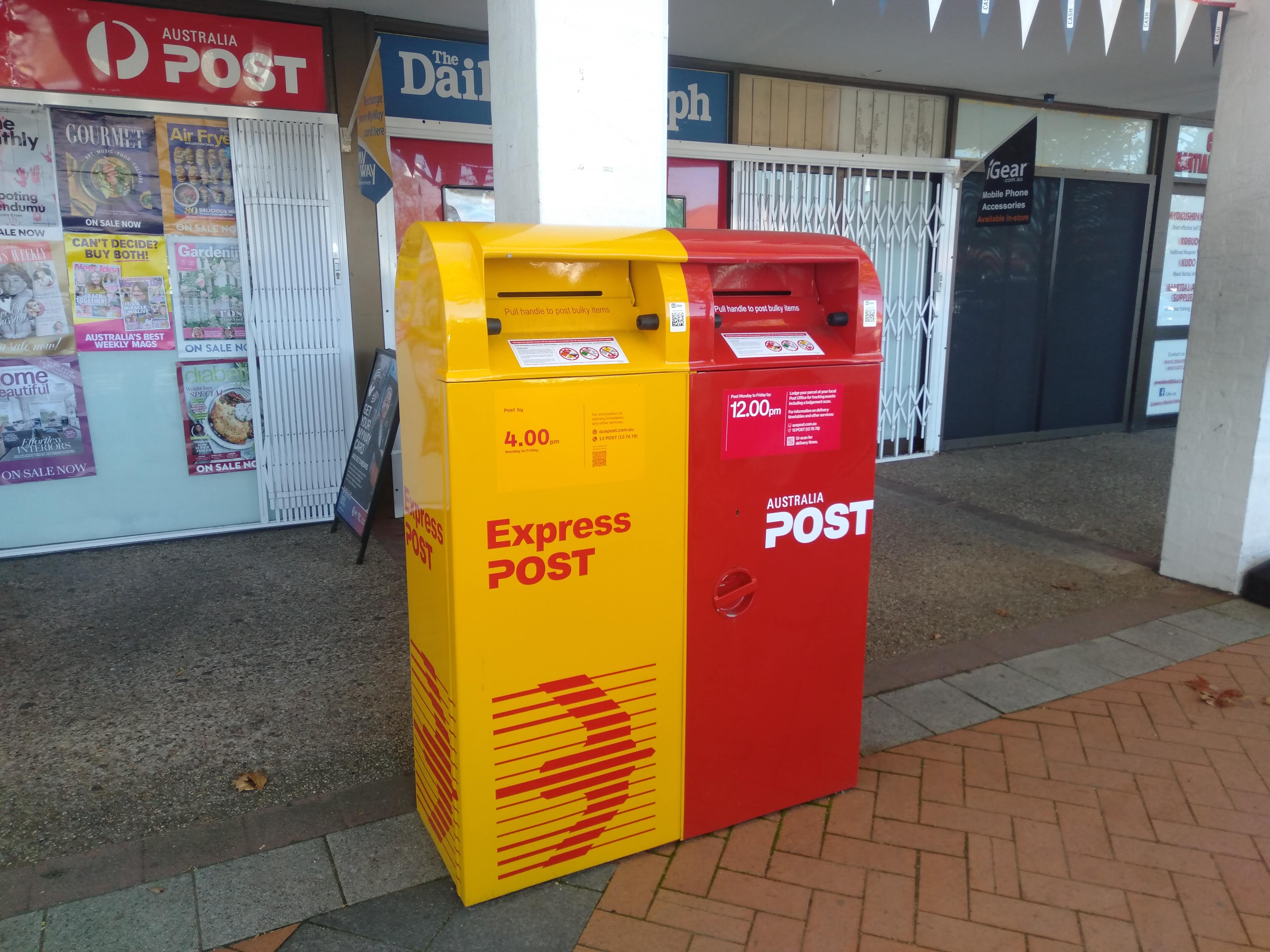
Express post box (yellow) and Australian Postal Corporation box (red) in Canberra, Australia

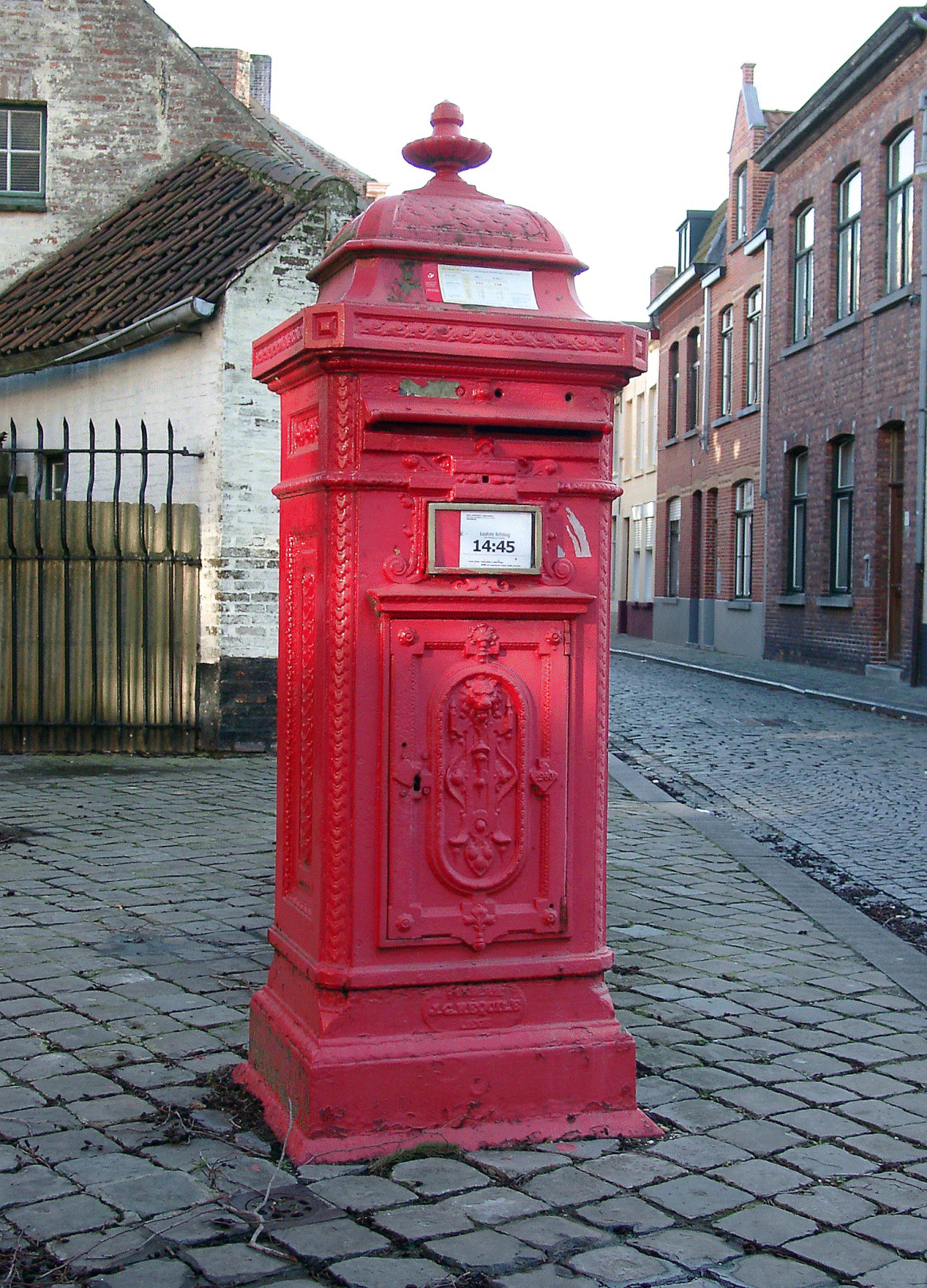
Pillar box in Bruges, Belgium

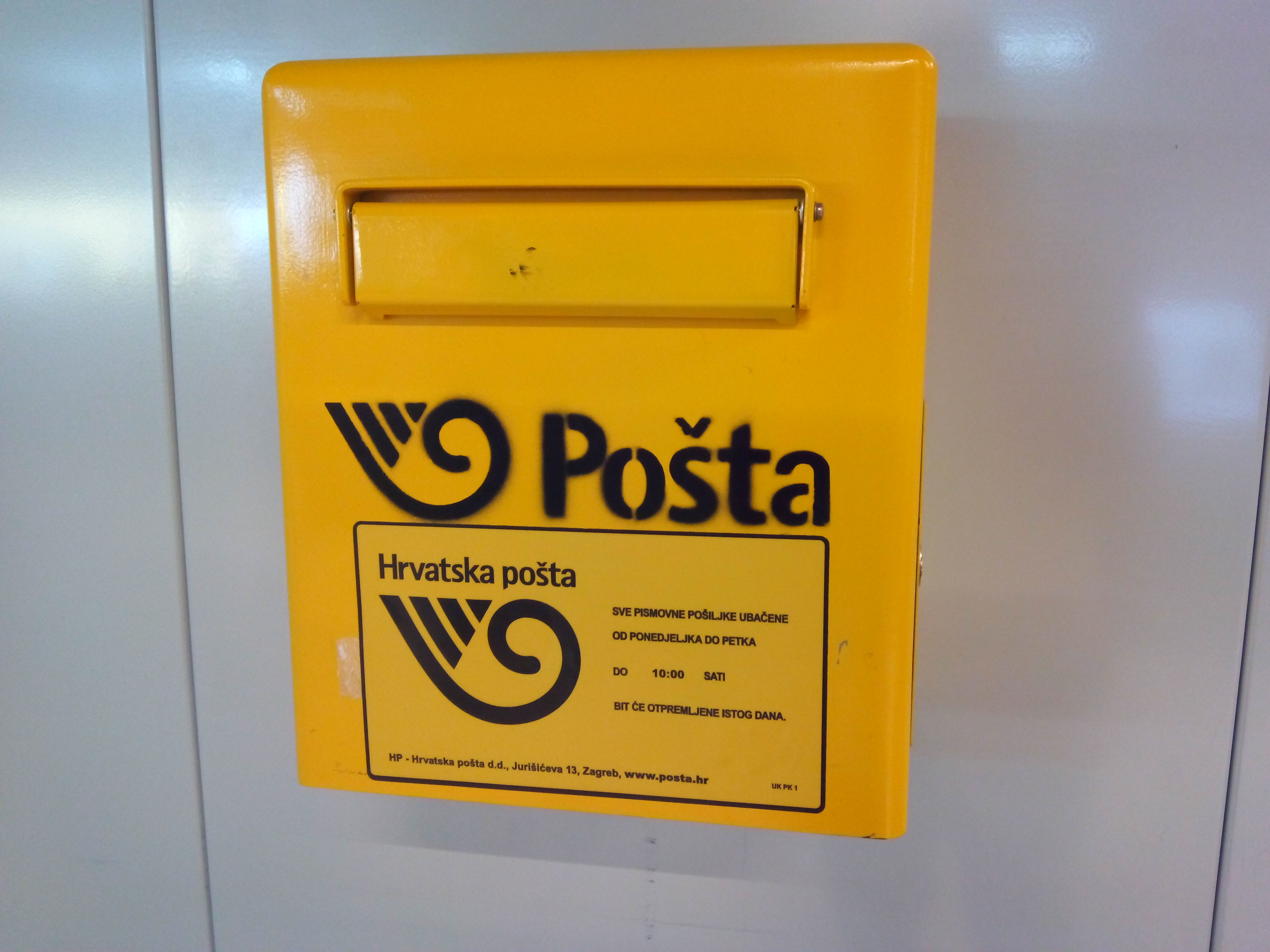
Post box at Dubrovnik Airport, Croatia

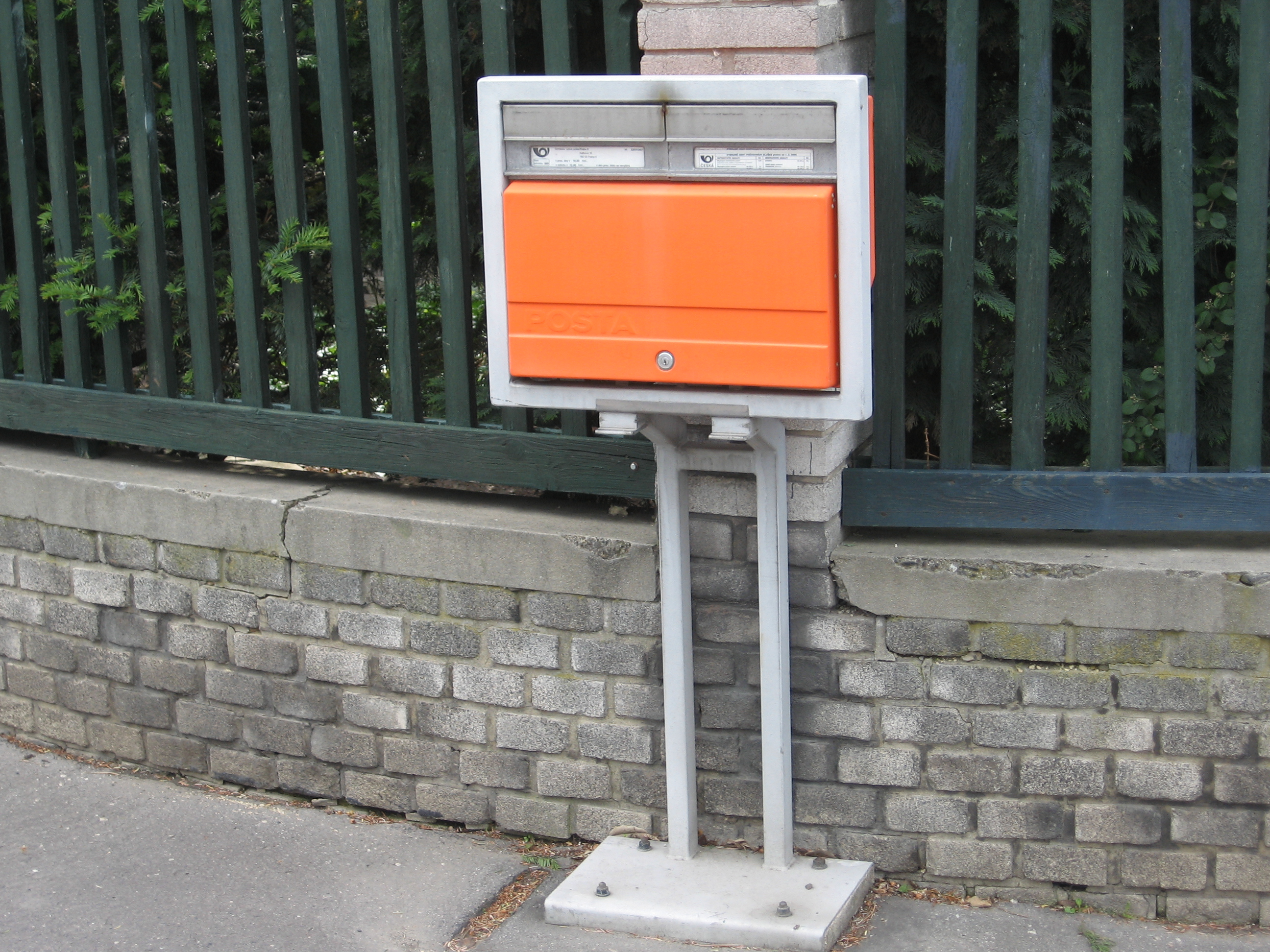
A Czech post box

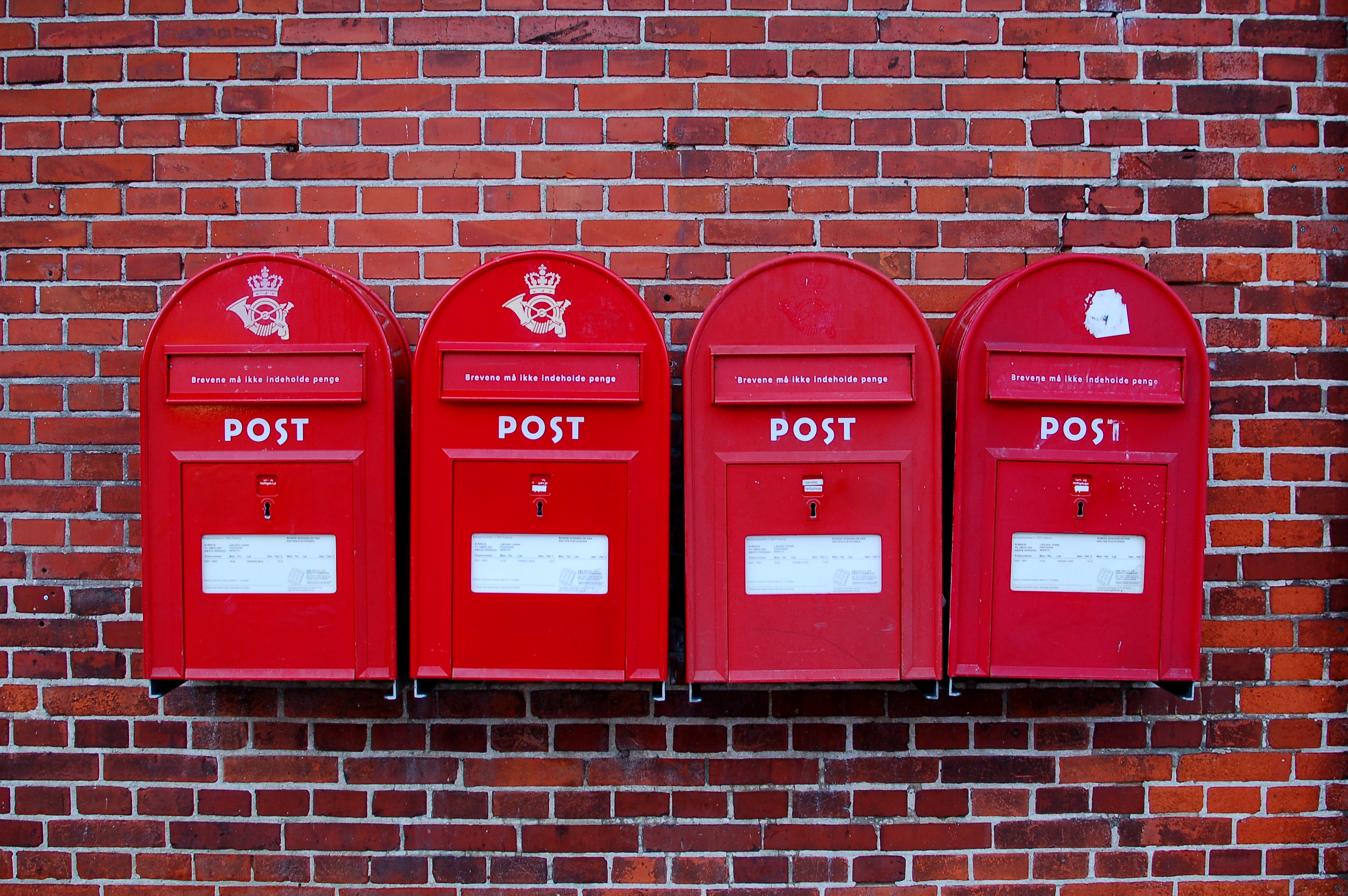
Post boxes in Fåborg, Denmark

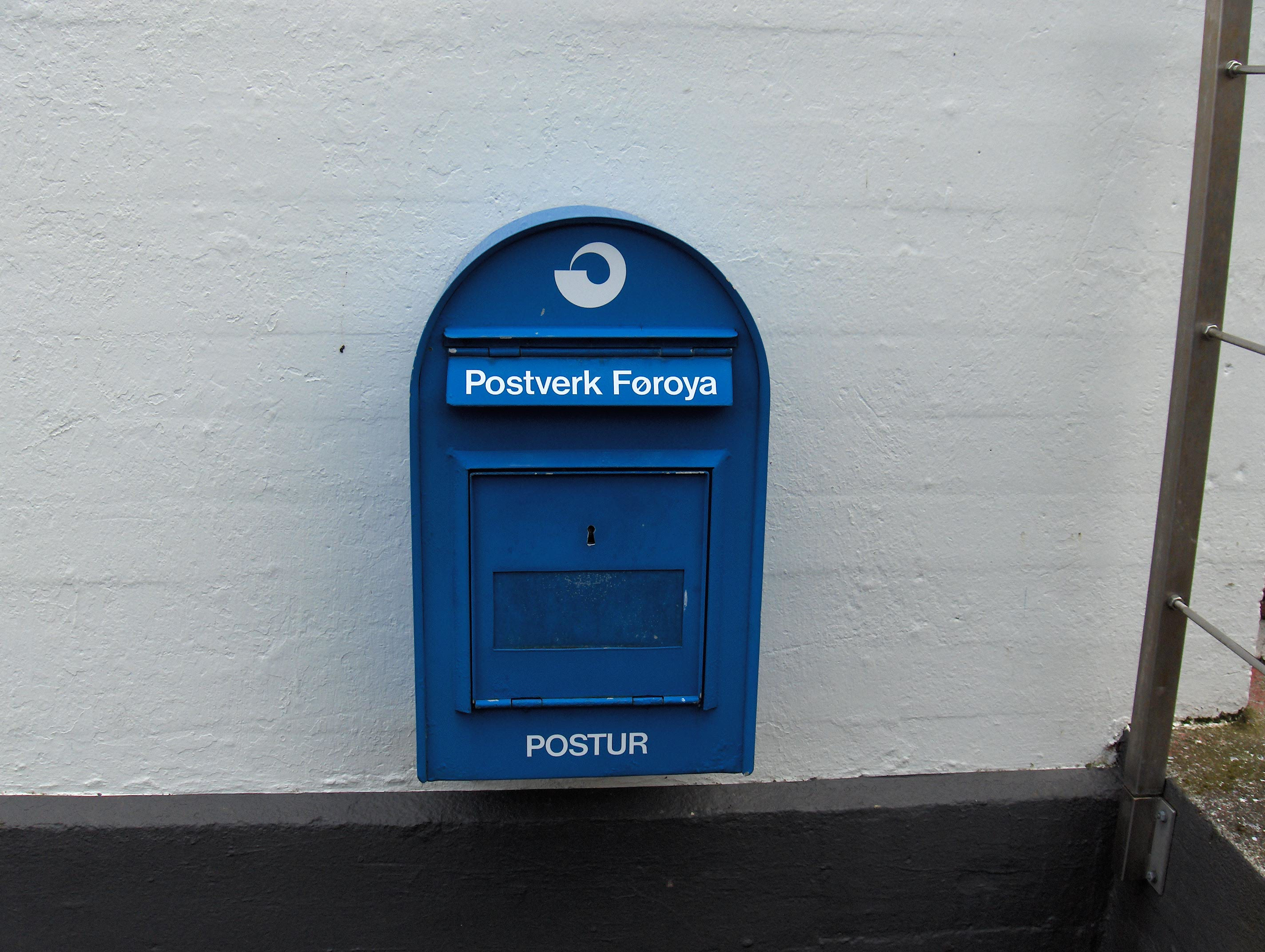
A post box in Funningur, Faroe Islands

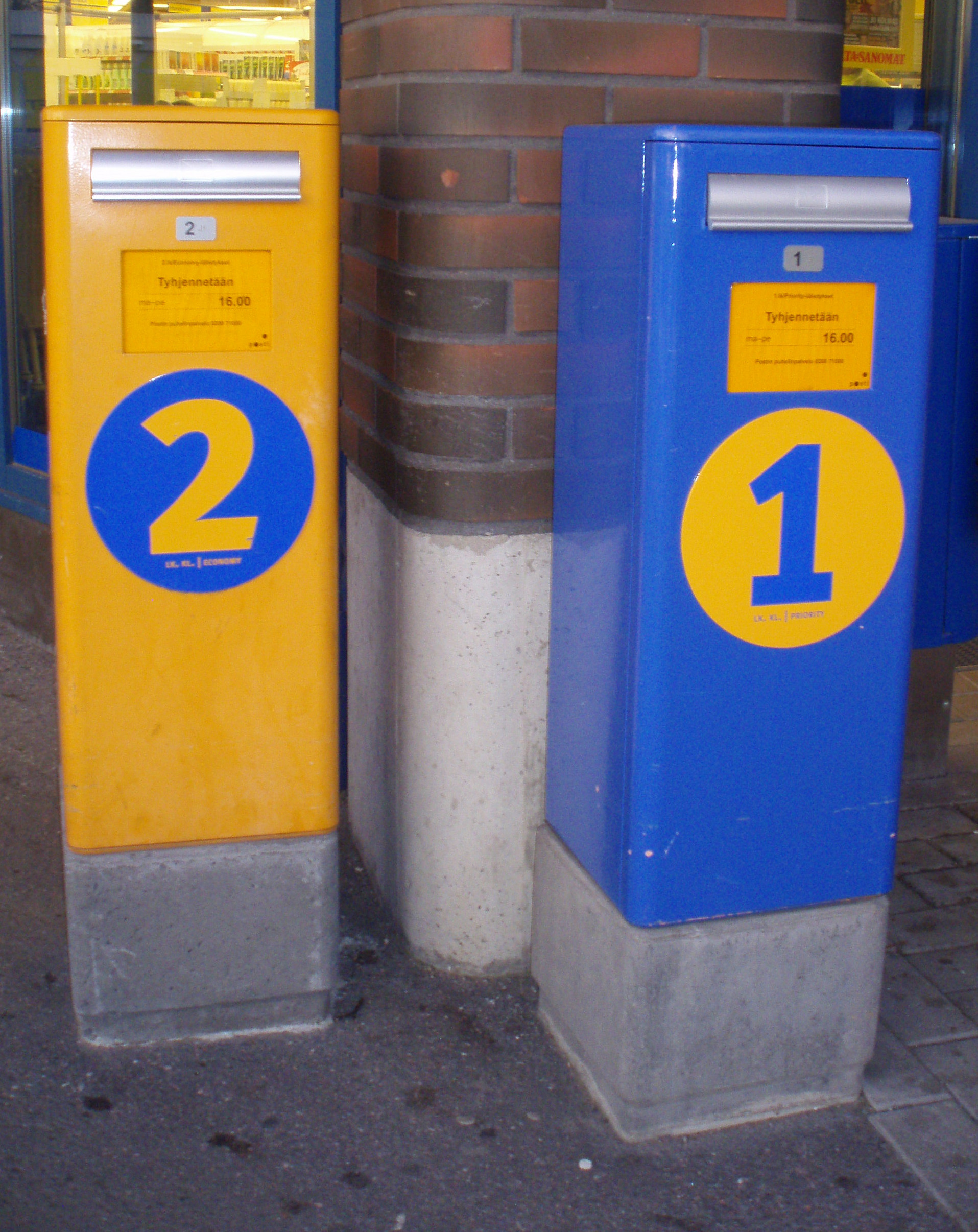
Post boxes in Heinola, Finland. Yellow 2nd class postbox is very common, blue 1st class mailboxes only at selected places.

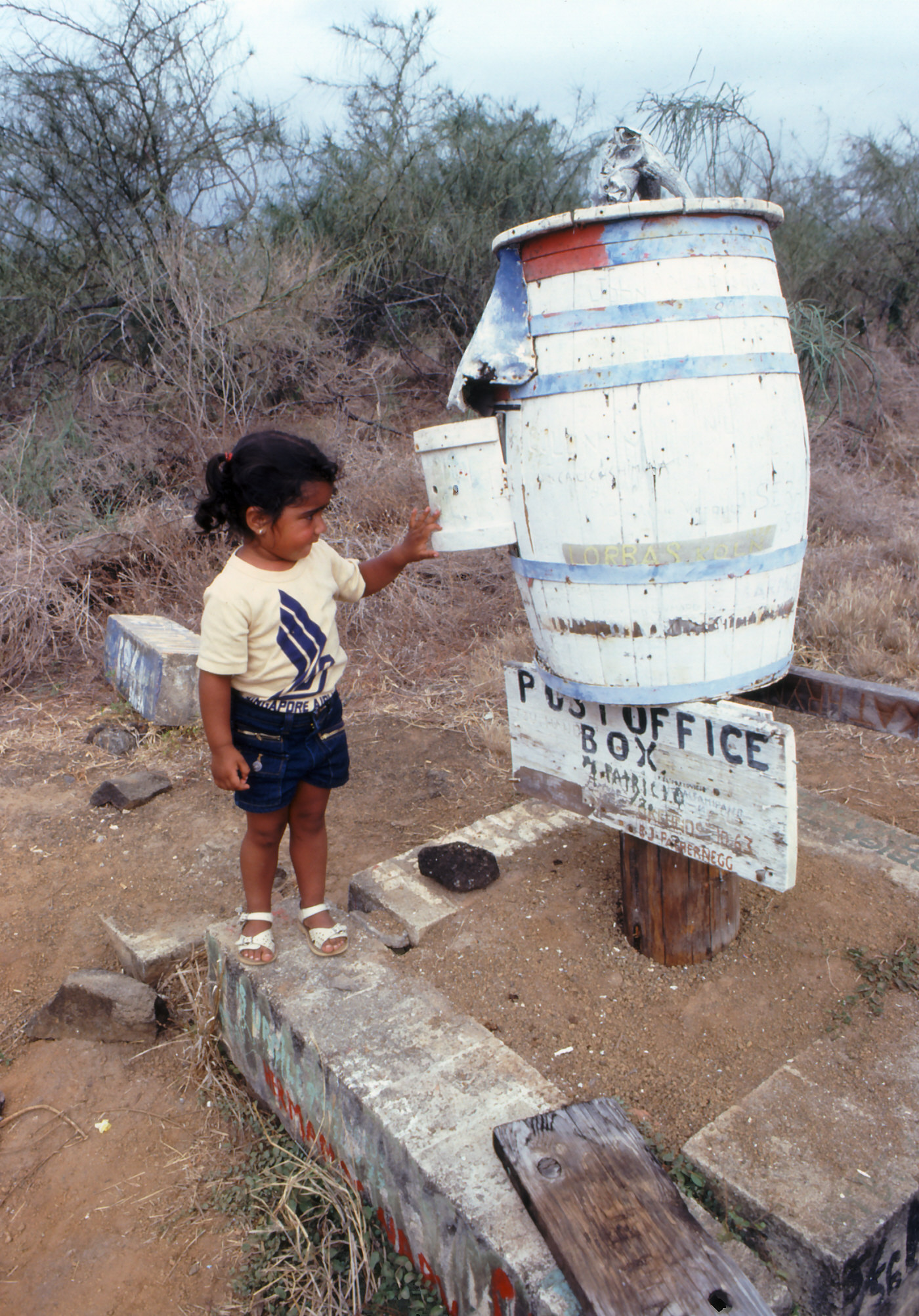
Post box in Galápagos Islands, 1983

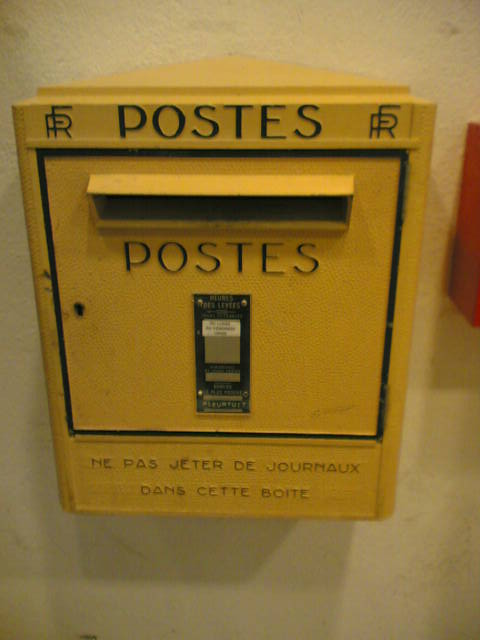
French Post Box at Dinard–Pleurtuit–Saint-Malo Airport

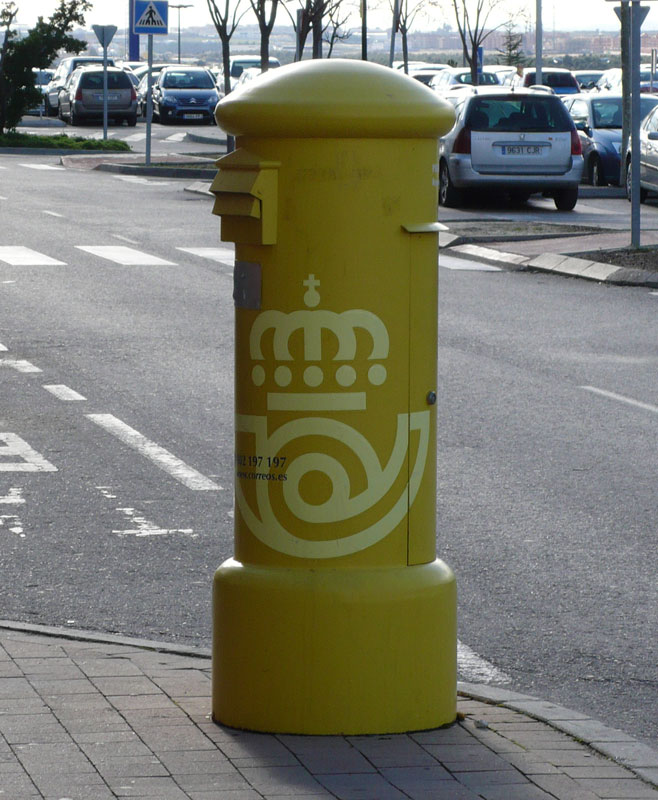
Spanish Post Box at Madrid parking lot

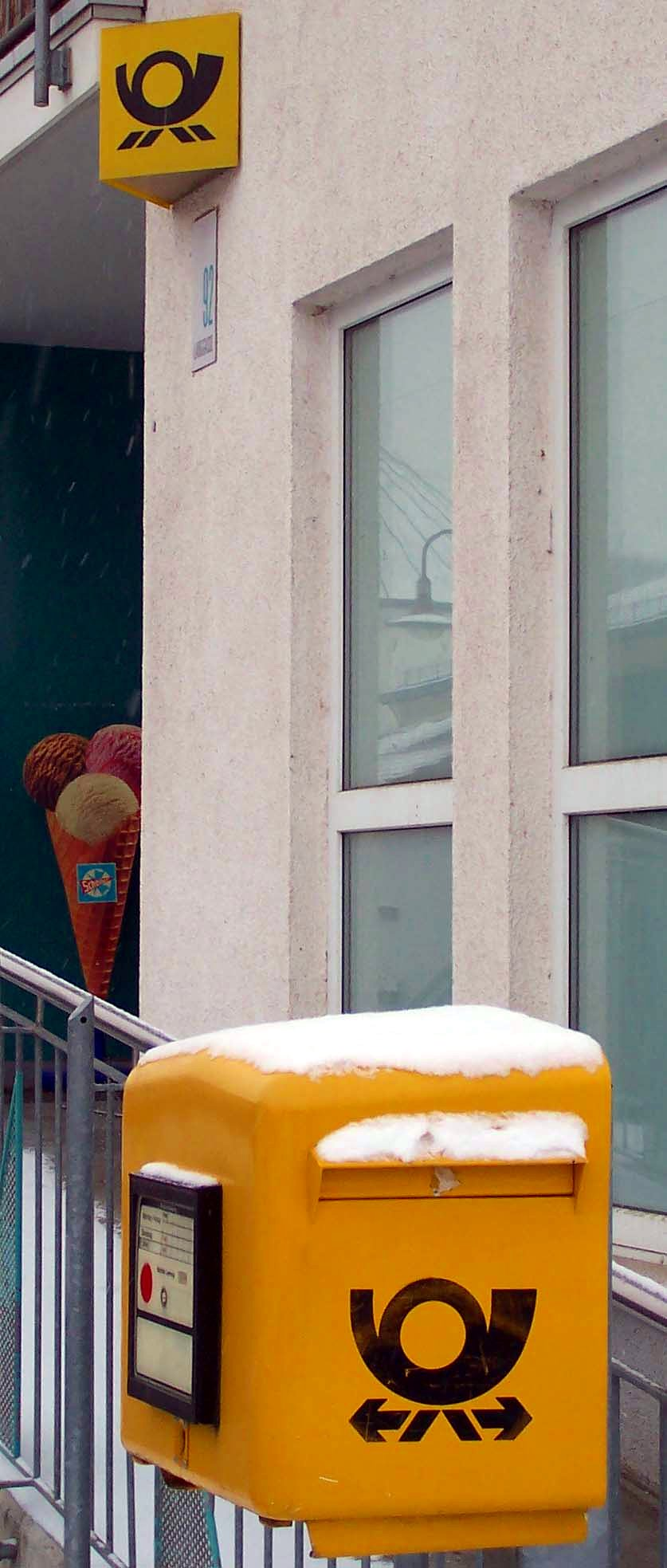
German mail box with an old Post horn with arrows (stylized lightning bolts) from the Deutsche Bundespost, on the top sign the new post horn from Deutsche Post AG

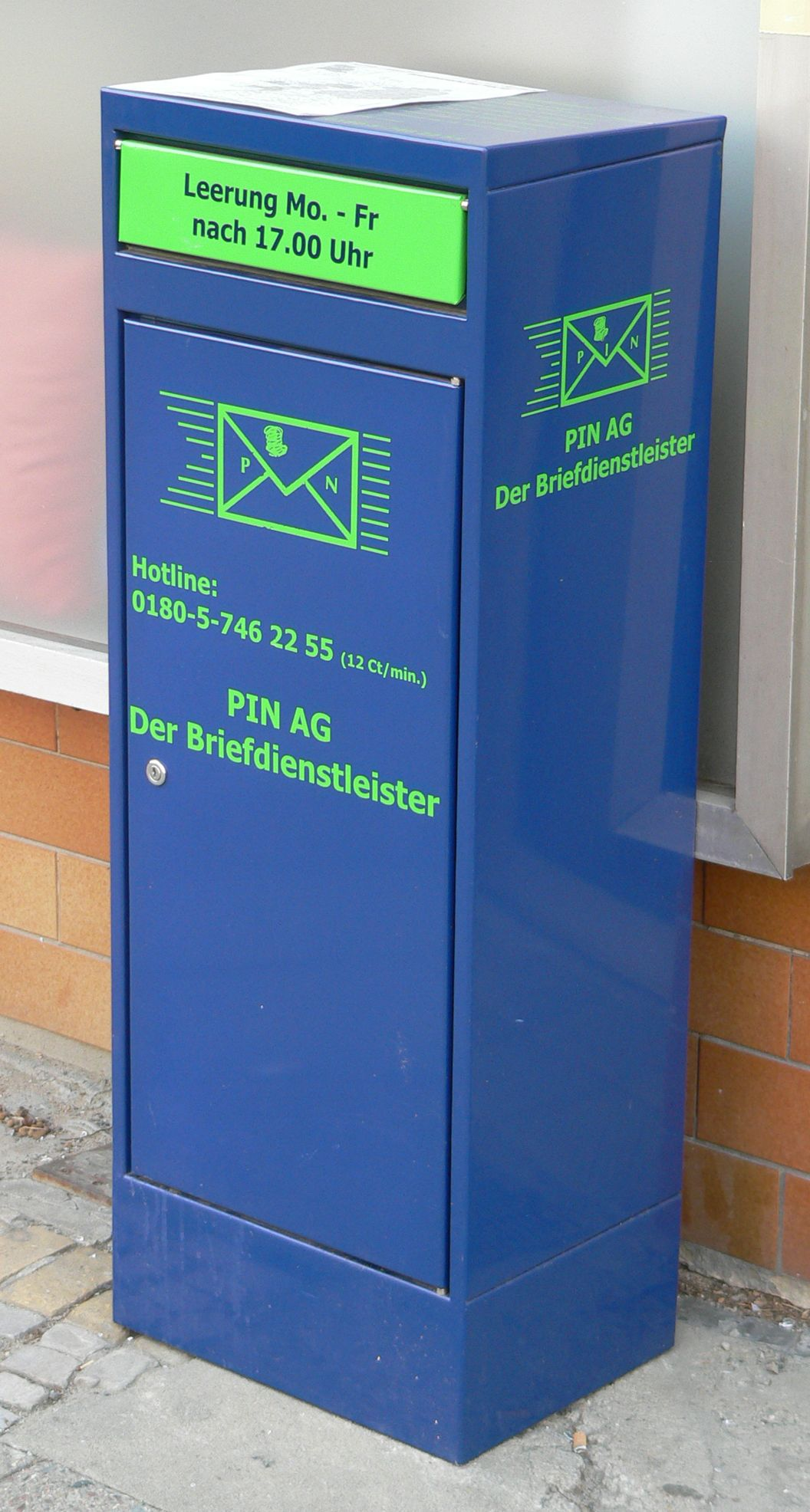
A postbox of one of the many private mail companies in Germany, this one PIN in Berlin

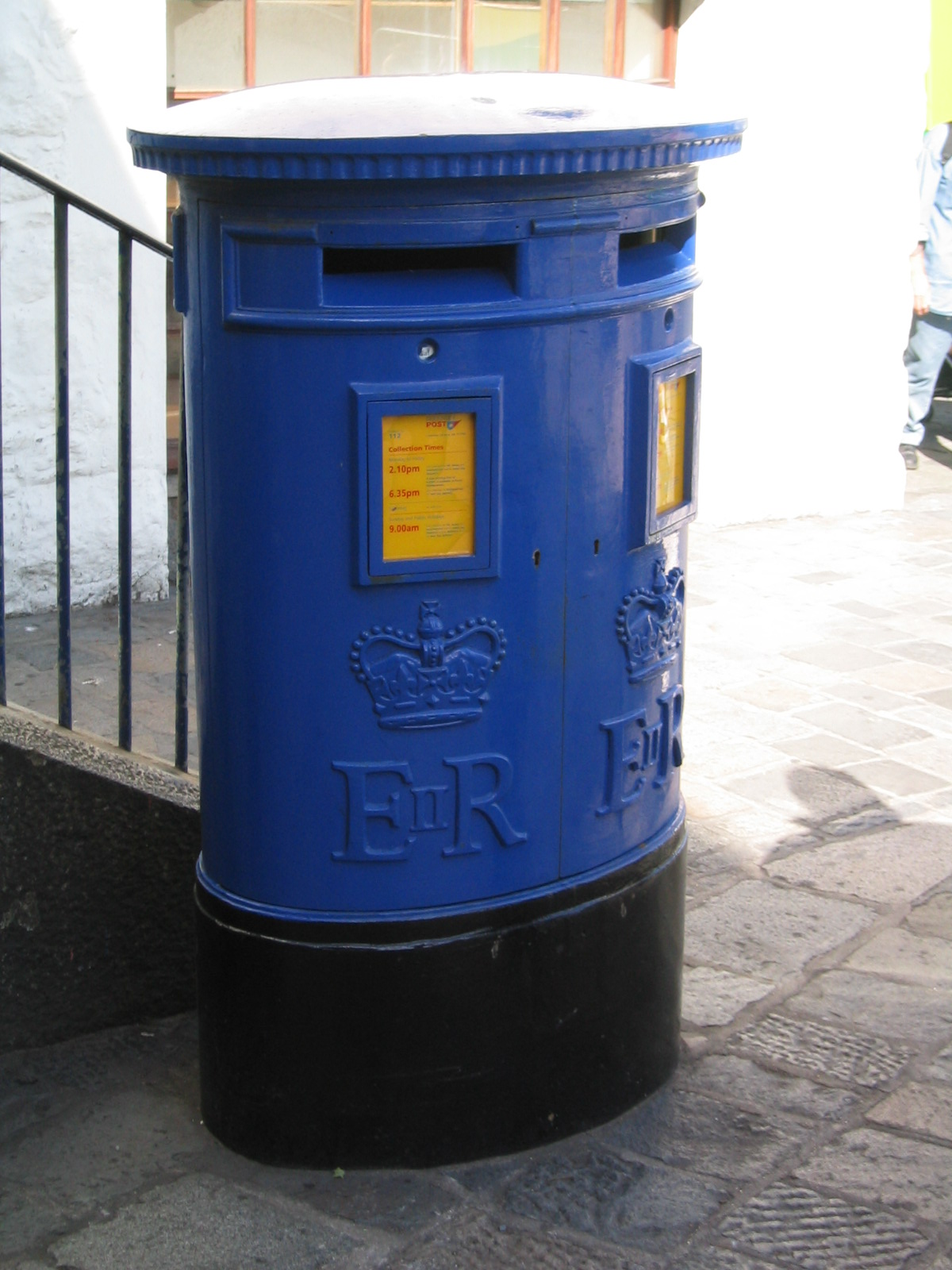
A Guernsey Post type C double aperture pillar box

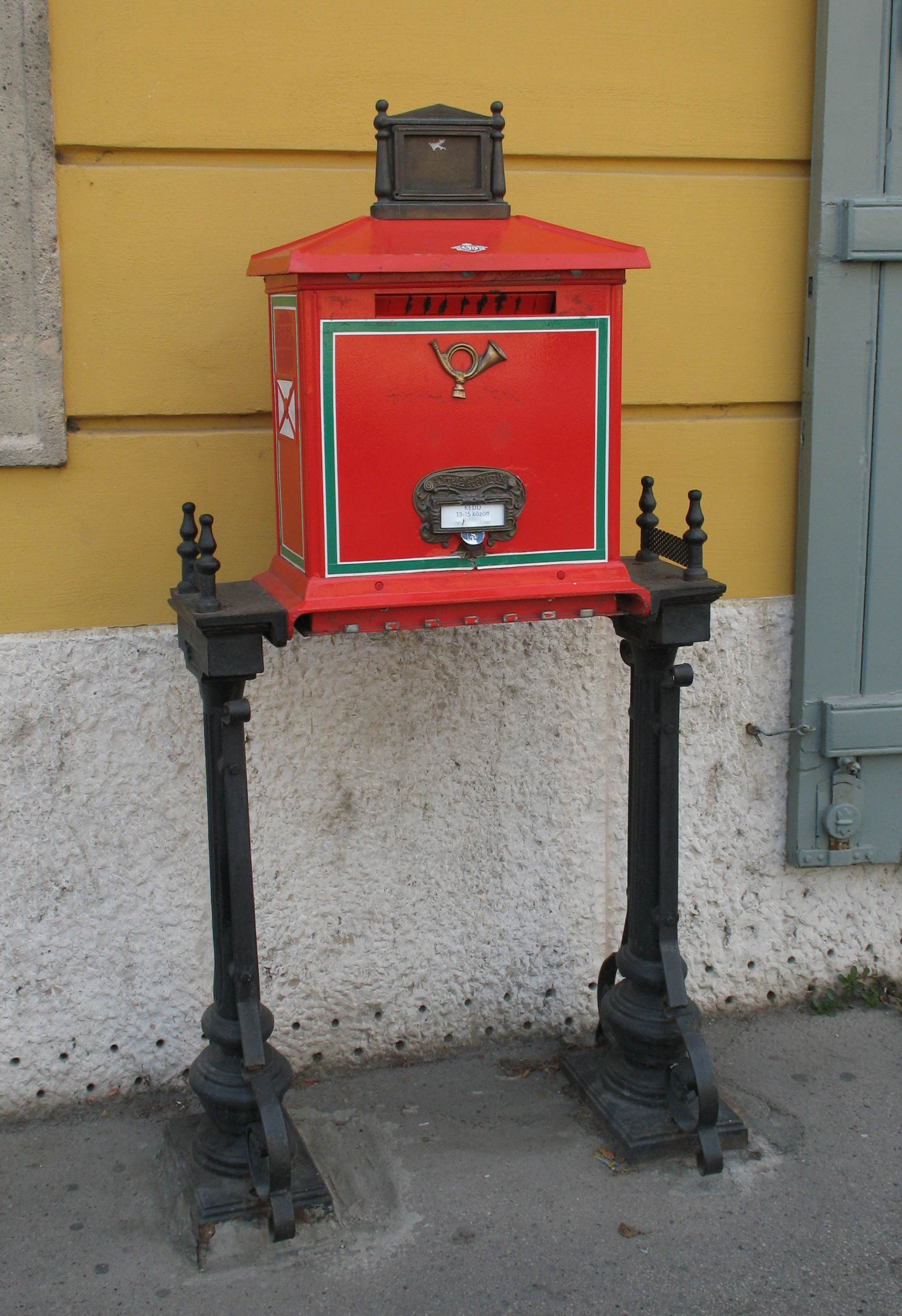
Post box in Budapest, Hungary

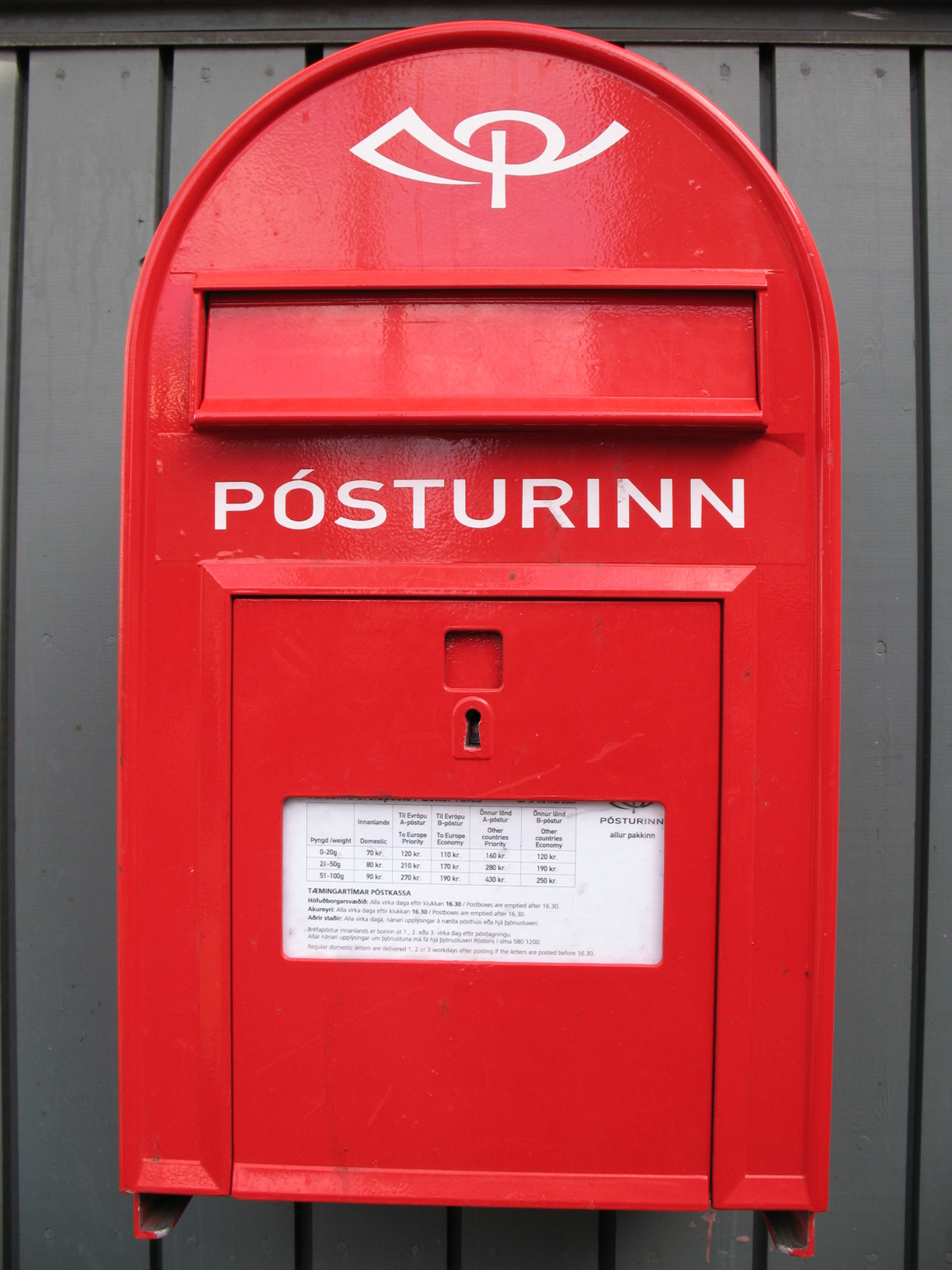
Post box in Reykjavík, Iceland

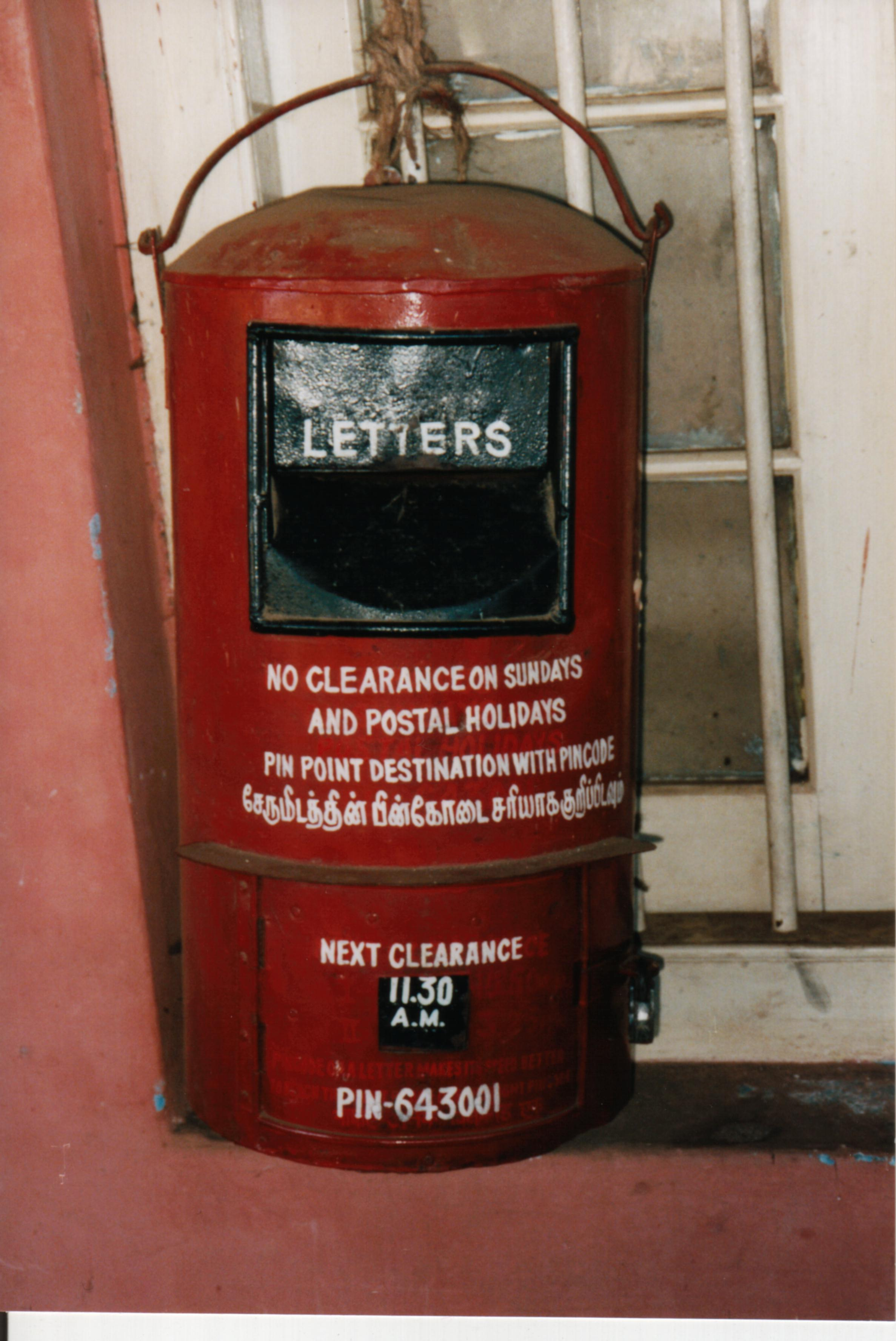
Post box of Indian Postal Service

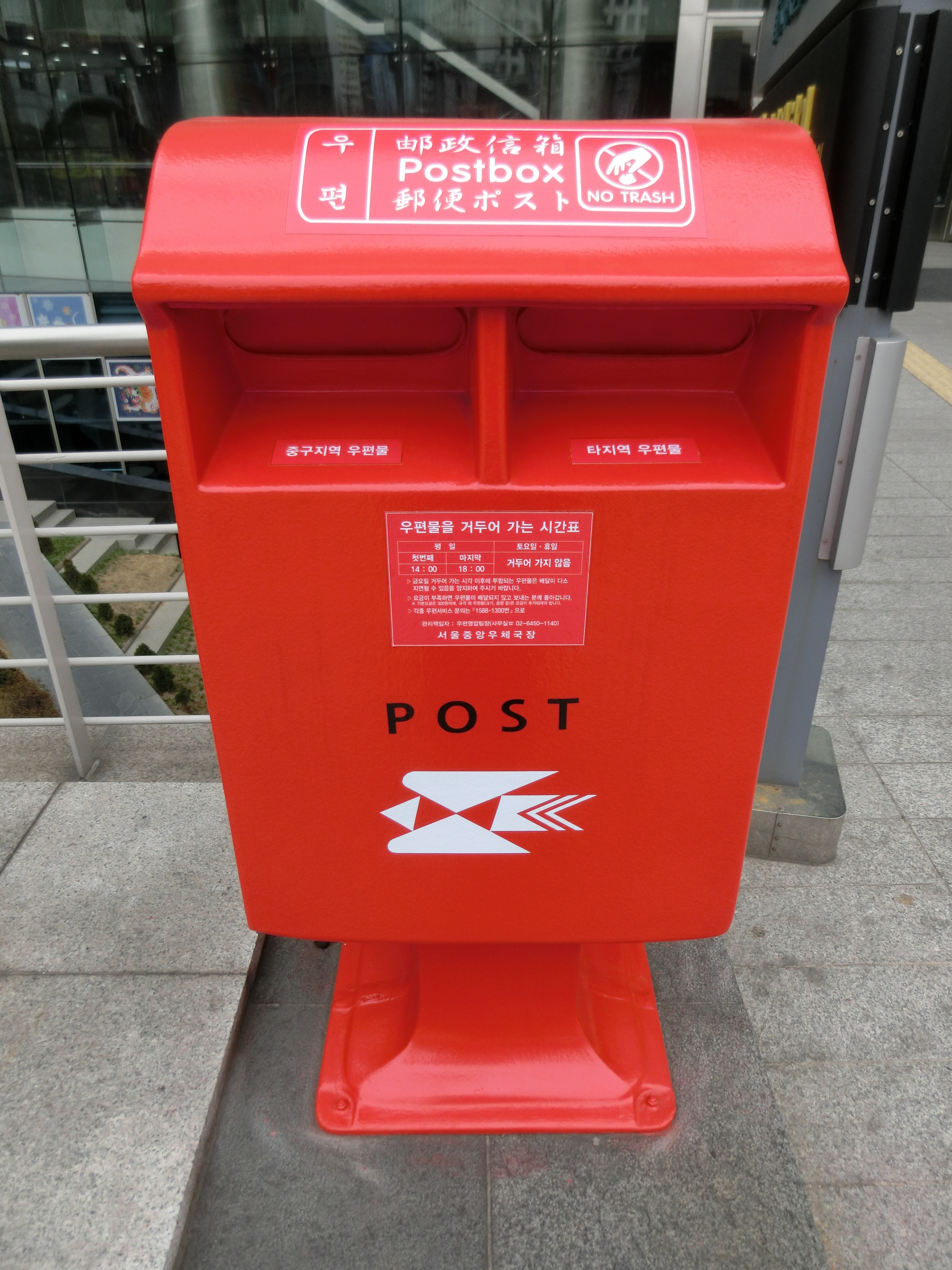
Post box outside the Central Post office in Seoul, South Korea

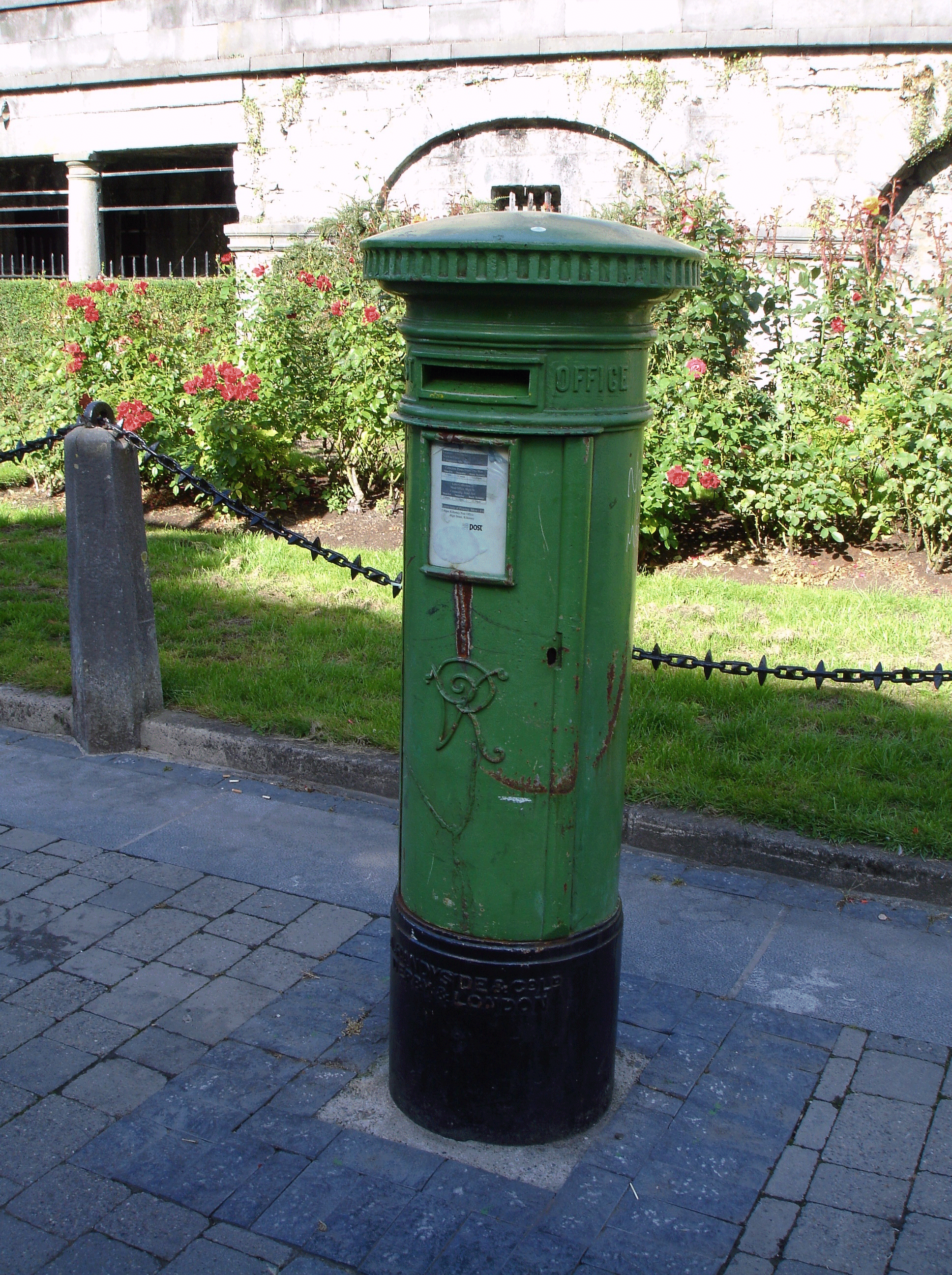
VR pillar box in Kilkenny, Ireland, painted green with obvious door repair

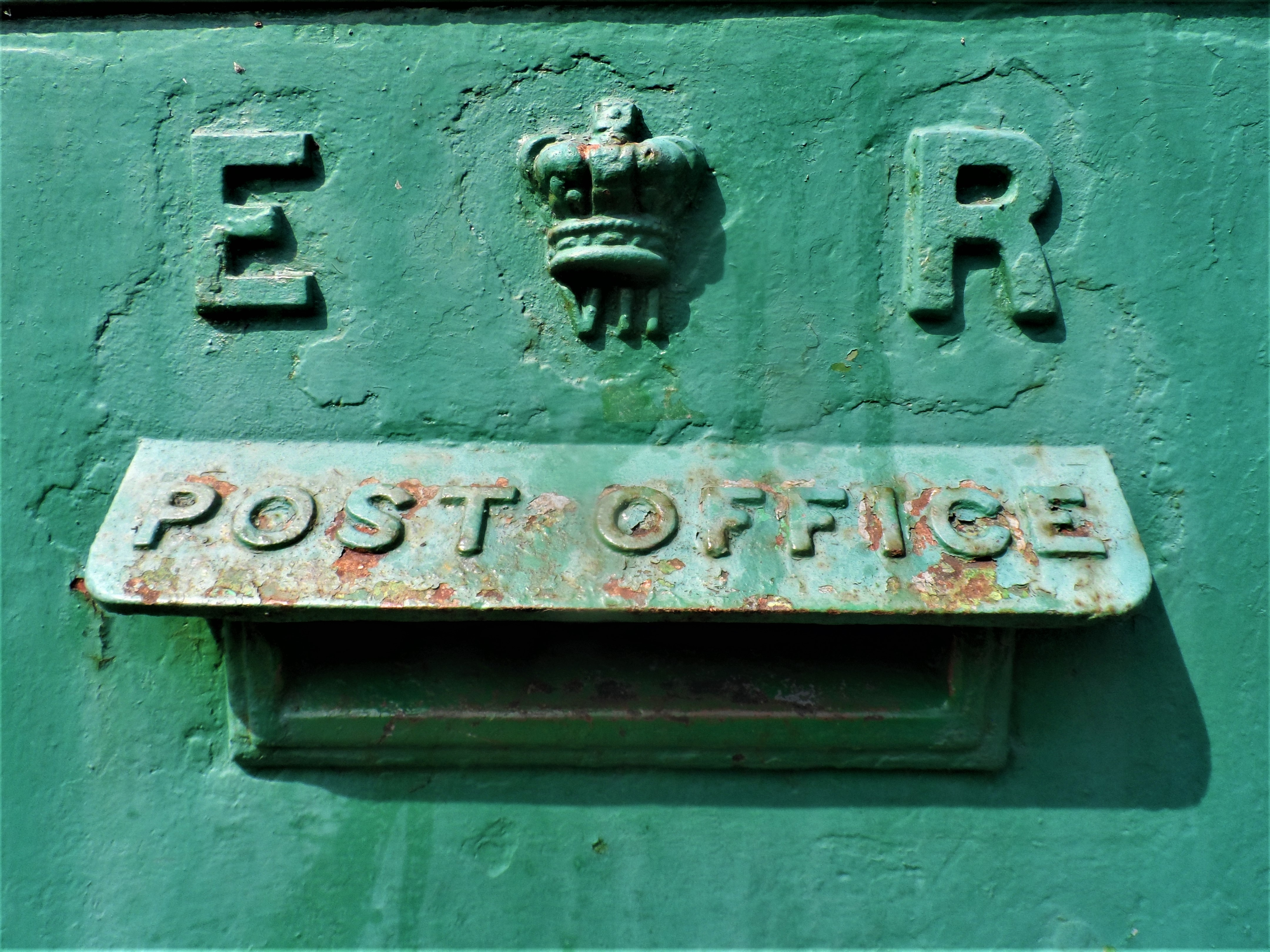
Edward VII post box in Ireland, painted green

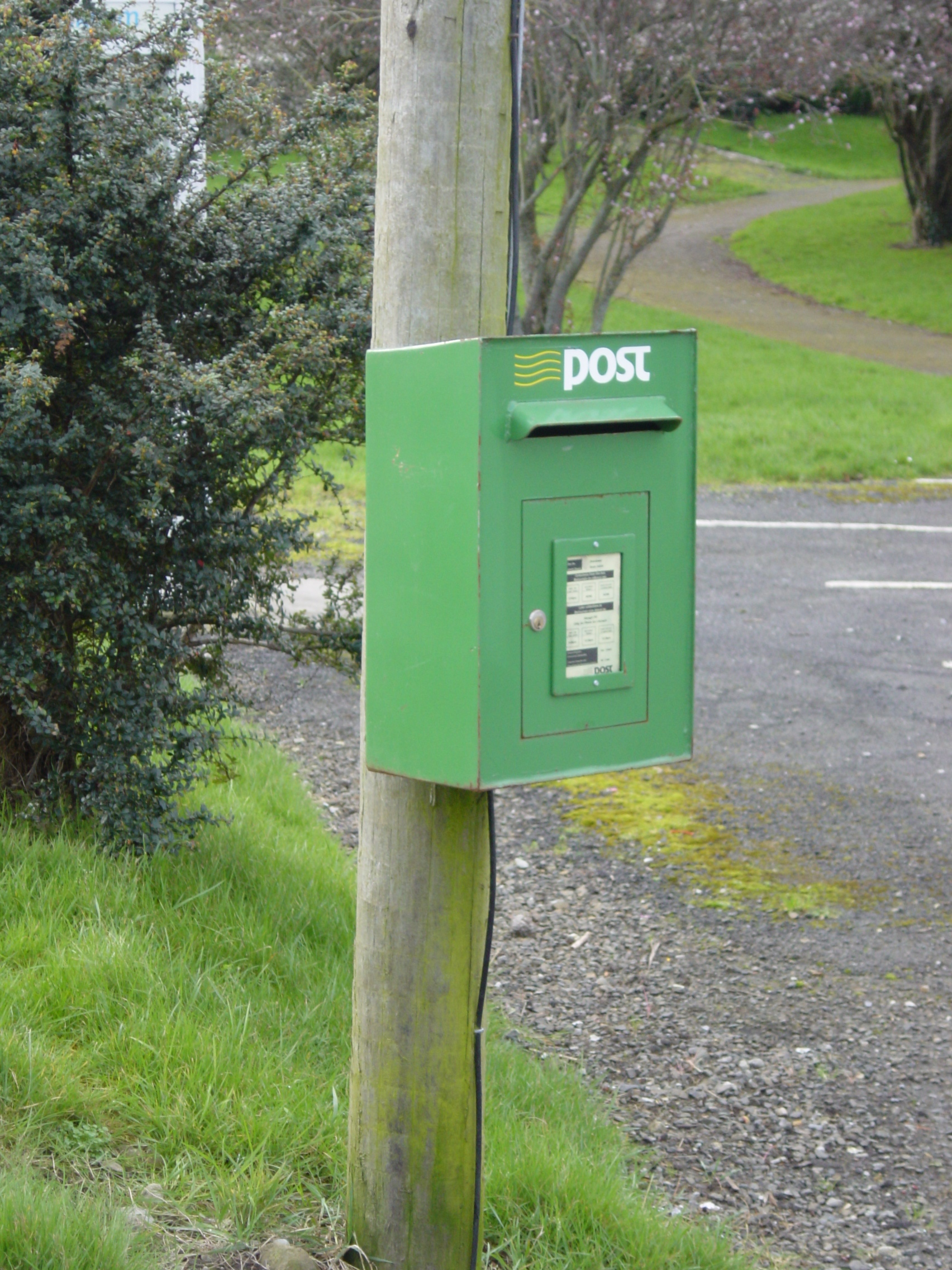
Irish lamp box erected by An Post

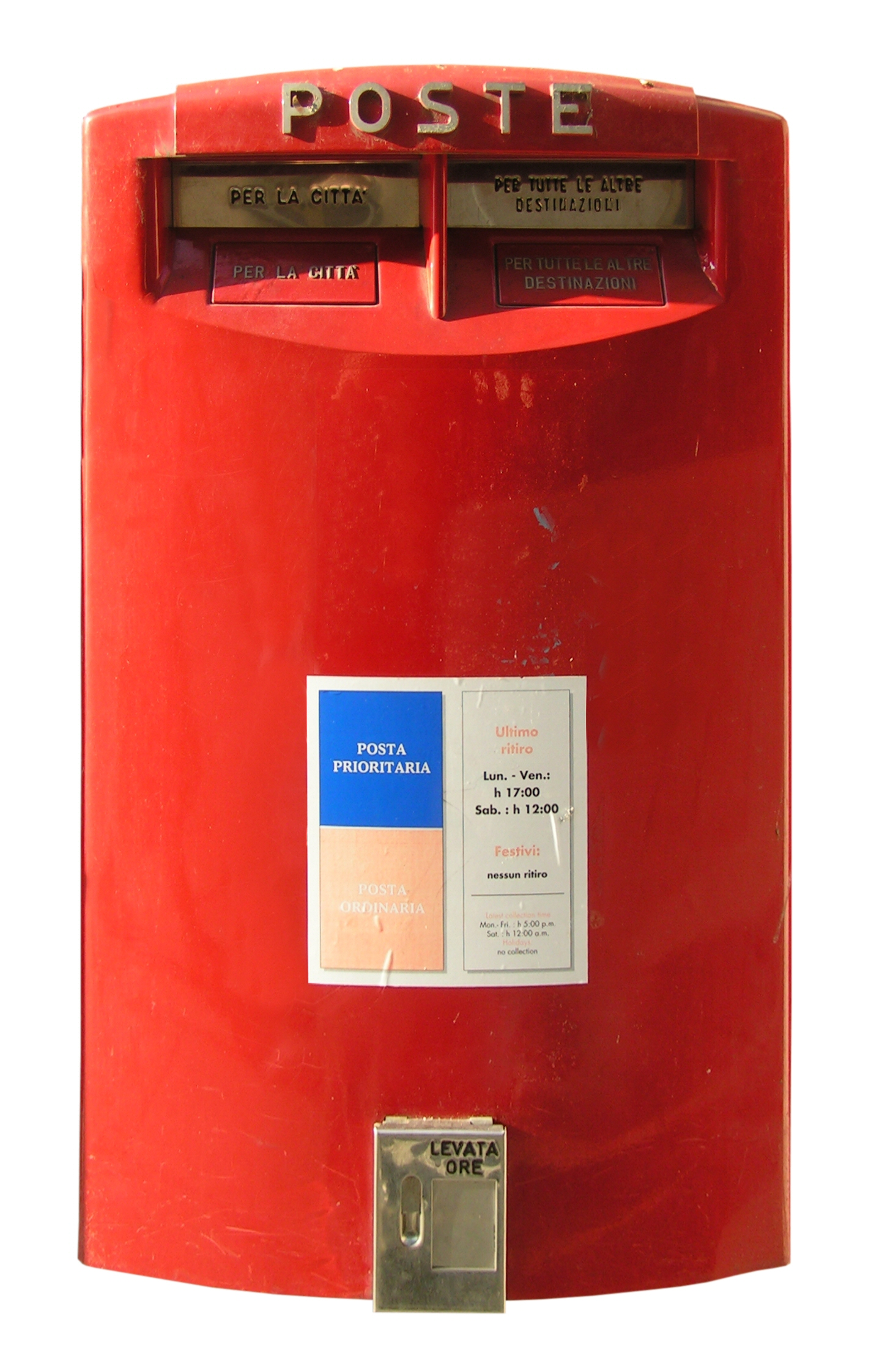
Italian domestic post box

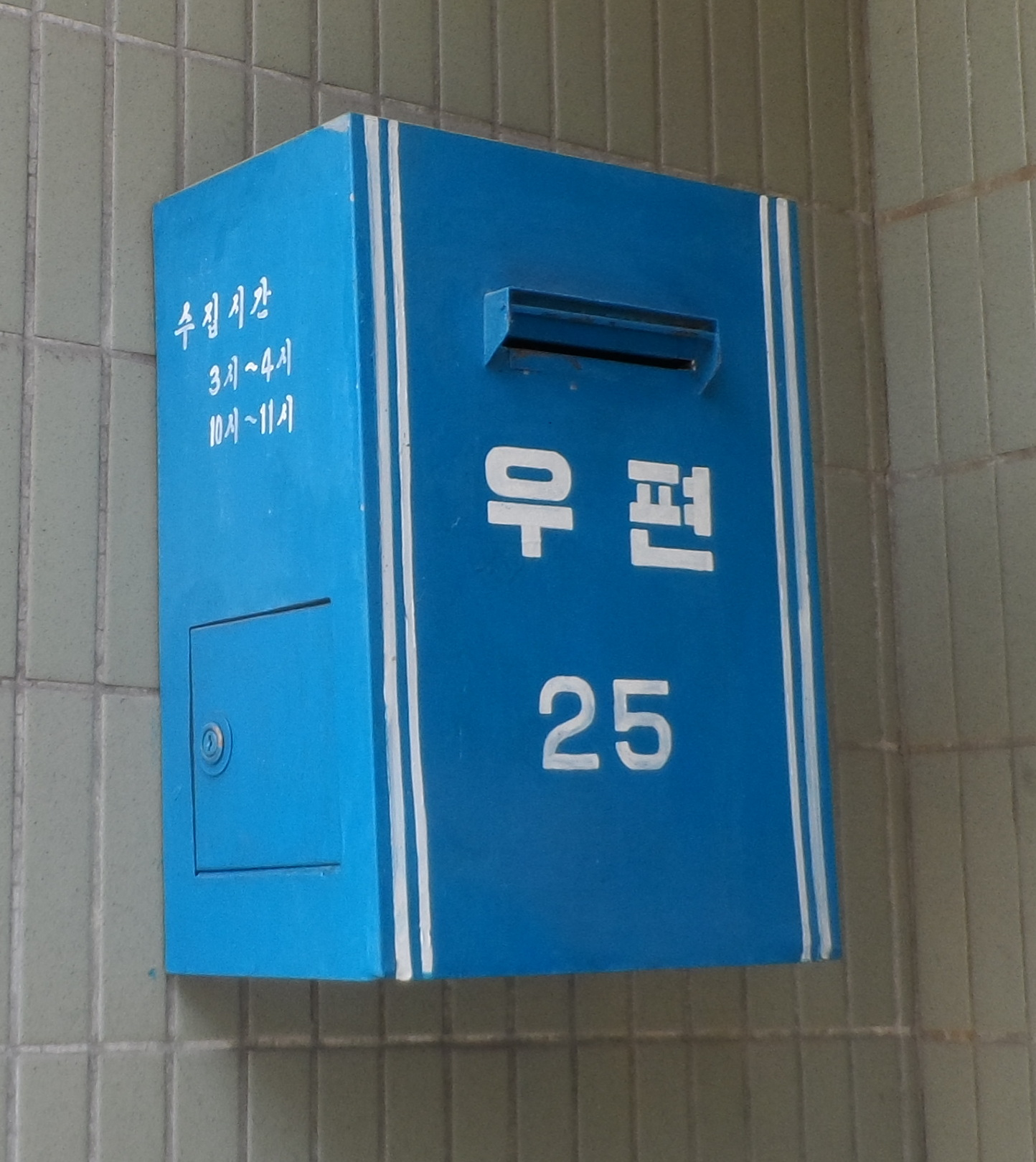
North Korea also have their own postal service operated by the Ministry of Post & Telecommunications. Post box outside the Pyongyang Stamp Shop.

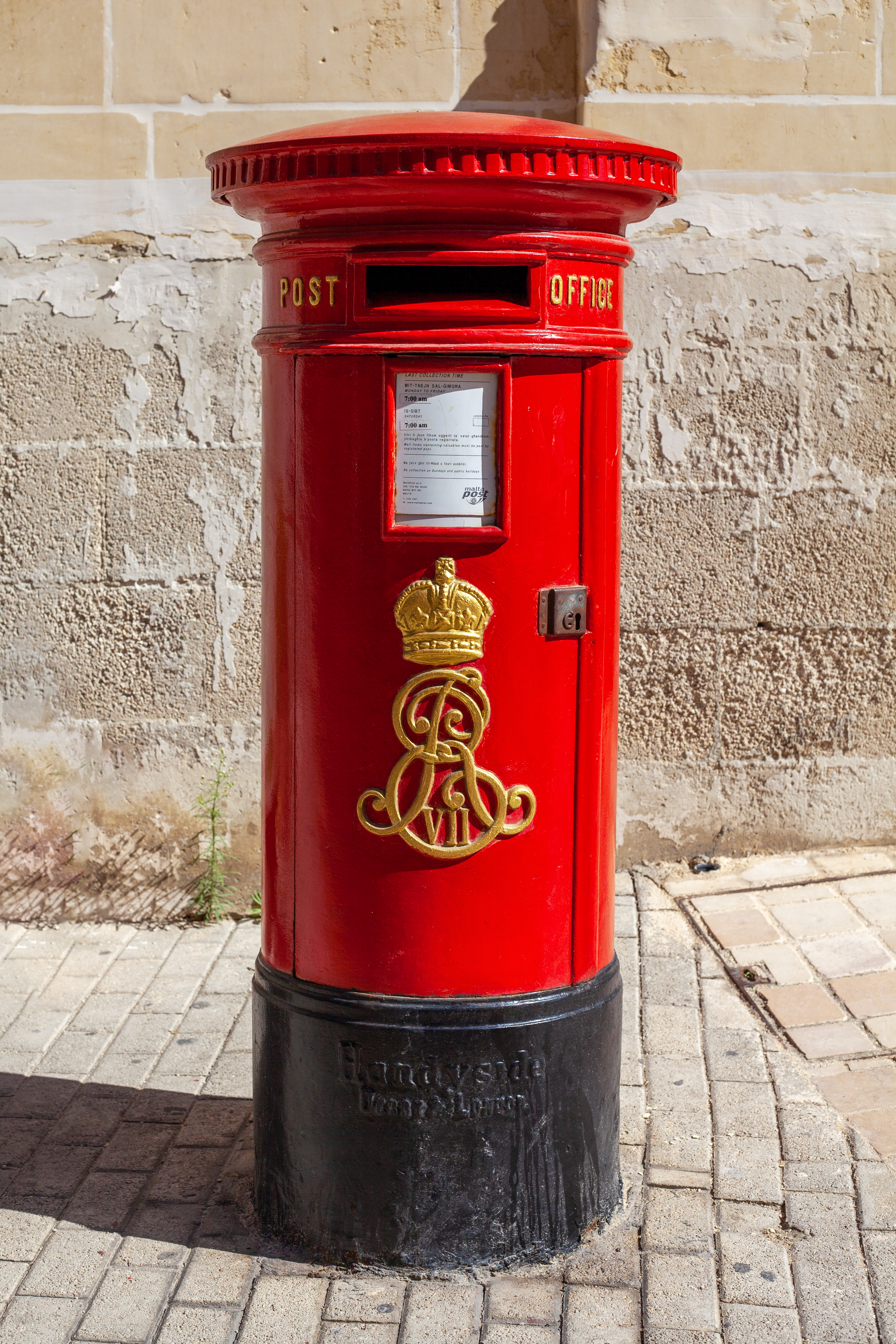
King Edward VII pillar box in Birgu, Malta

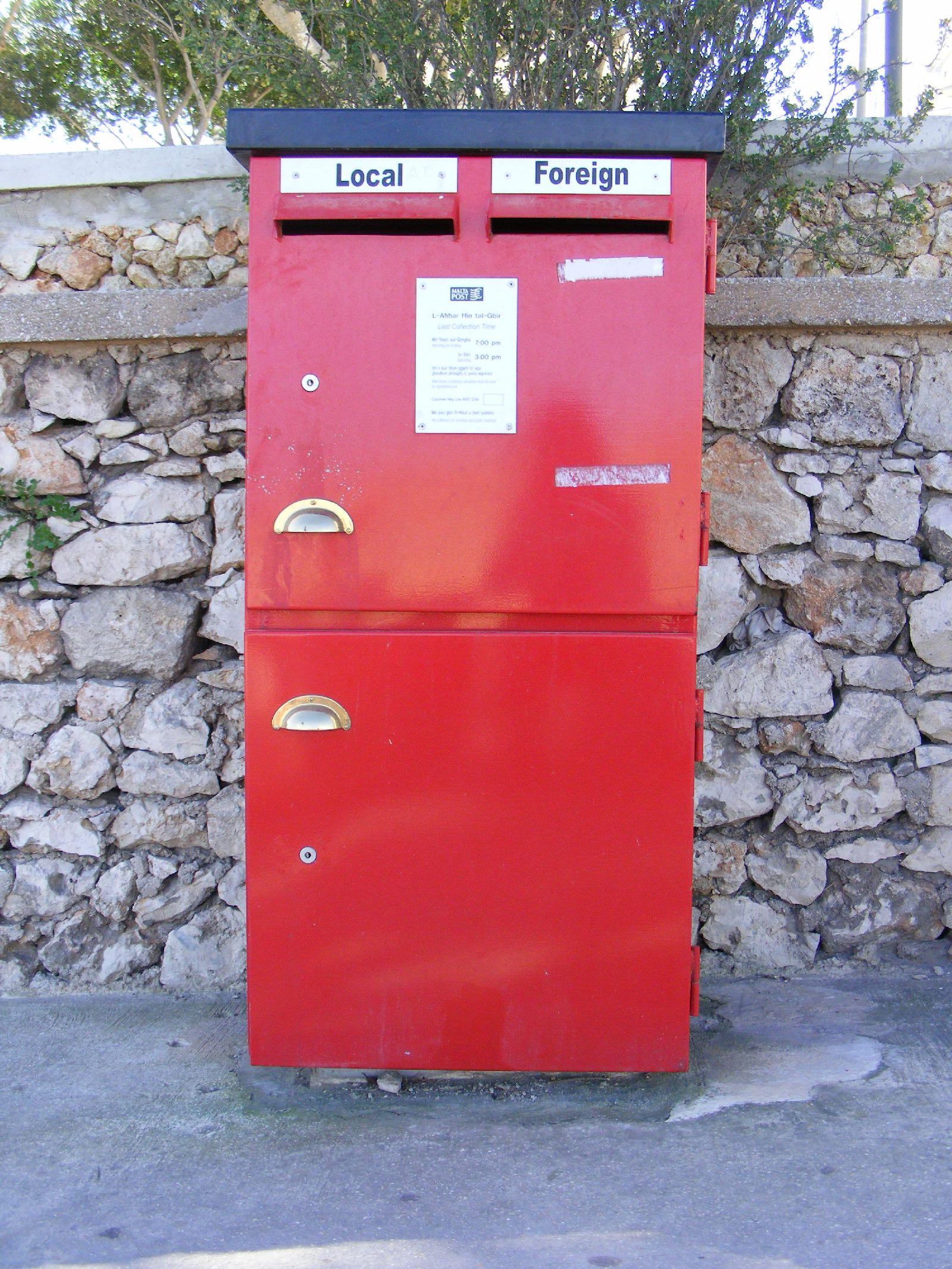
Modern MaltaPost post box in Mellieħa, Malta

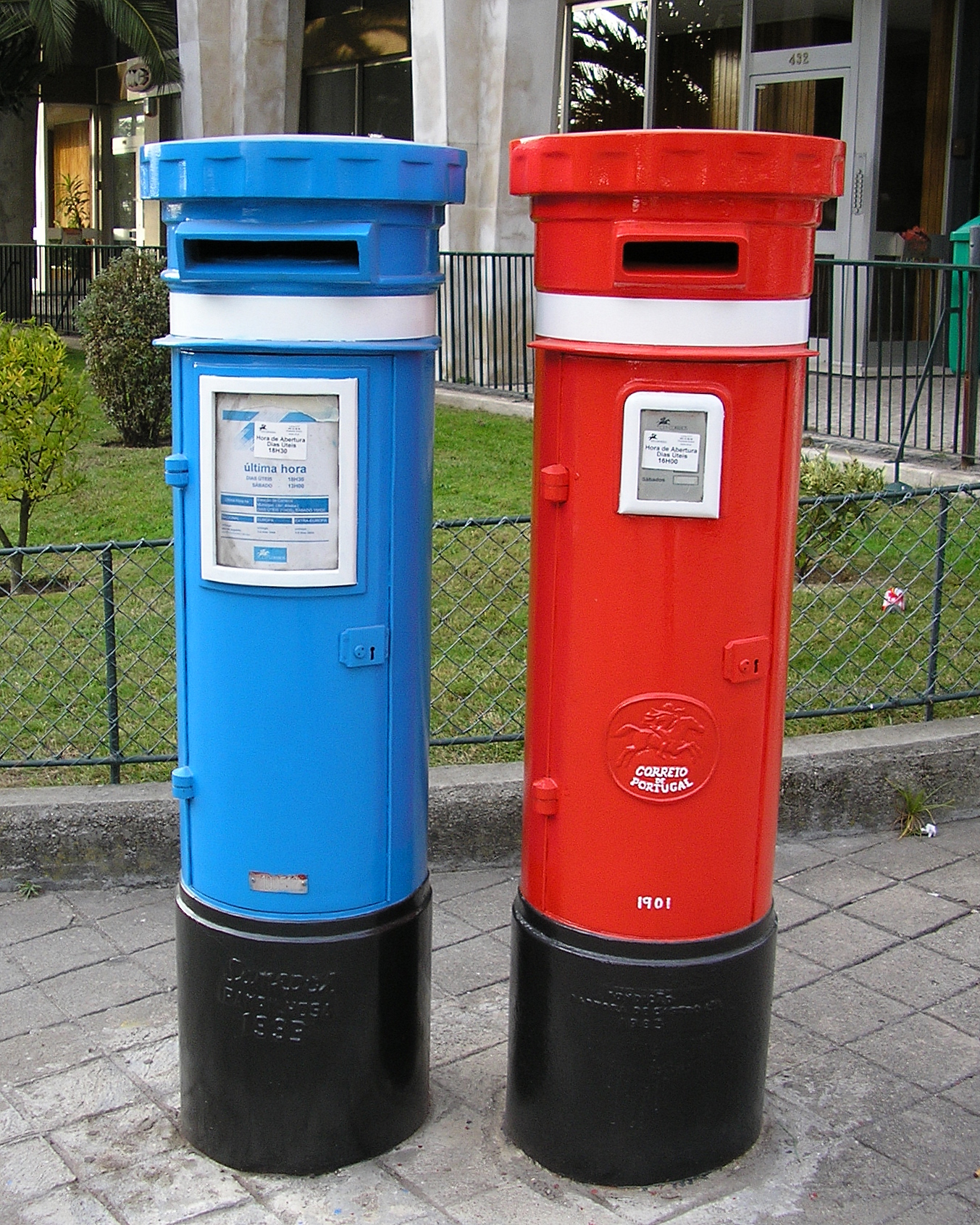
1st class (Blue Mail) and standard mail post boxes in Porto, Portugal

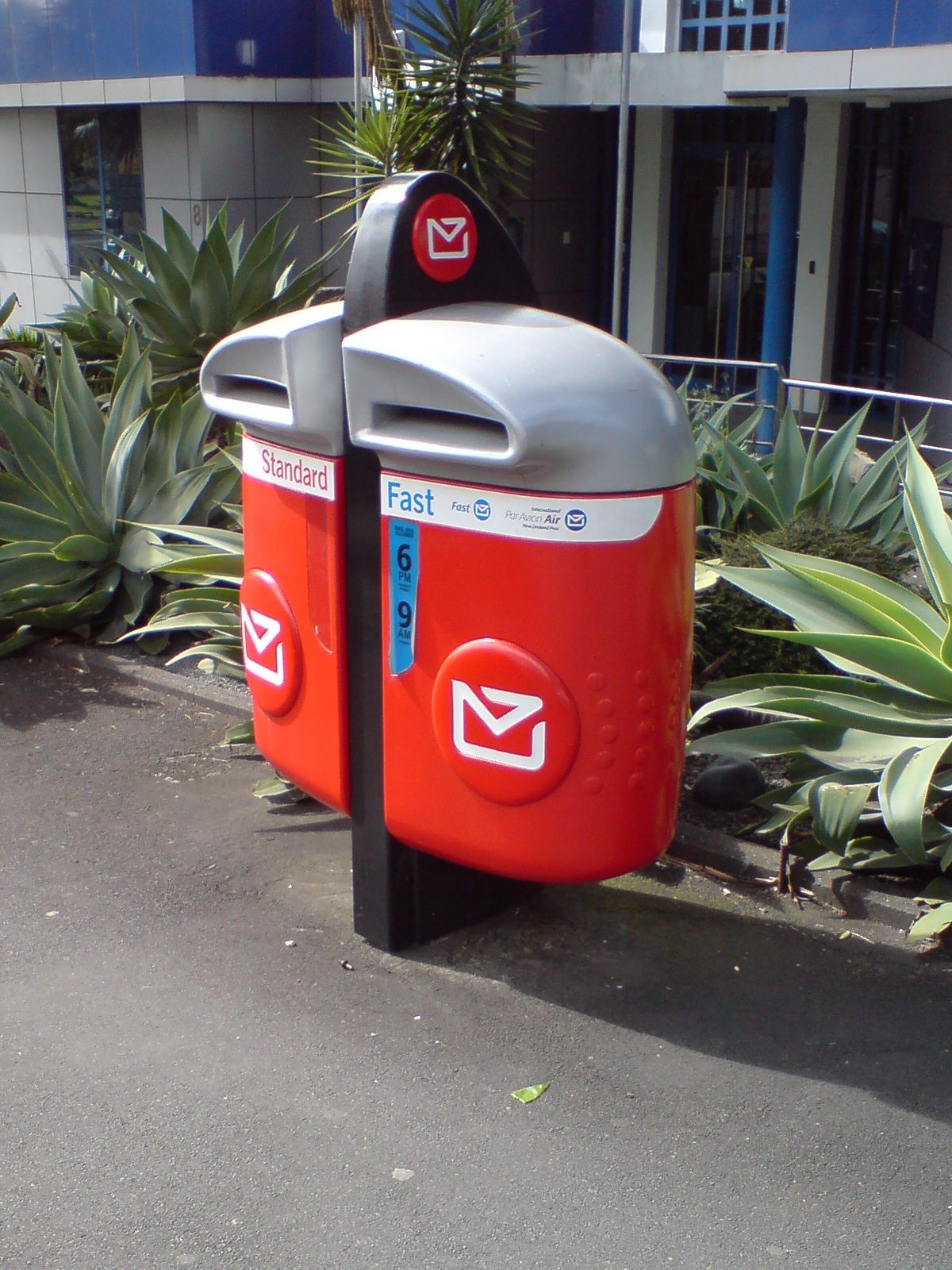
Post box in Aukland, New Zealand

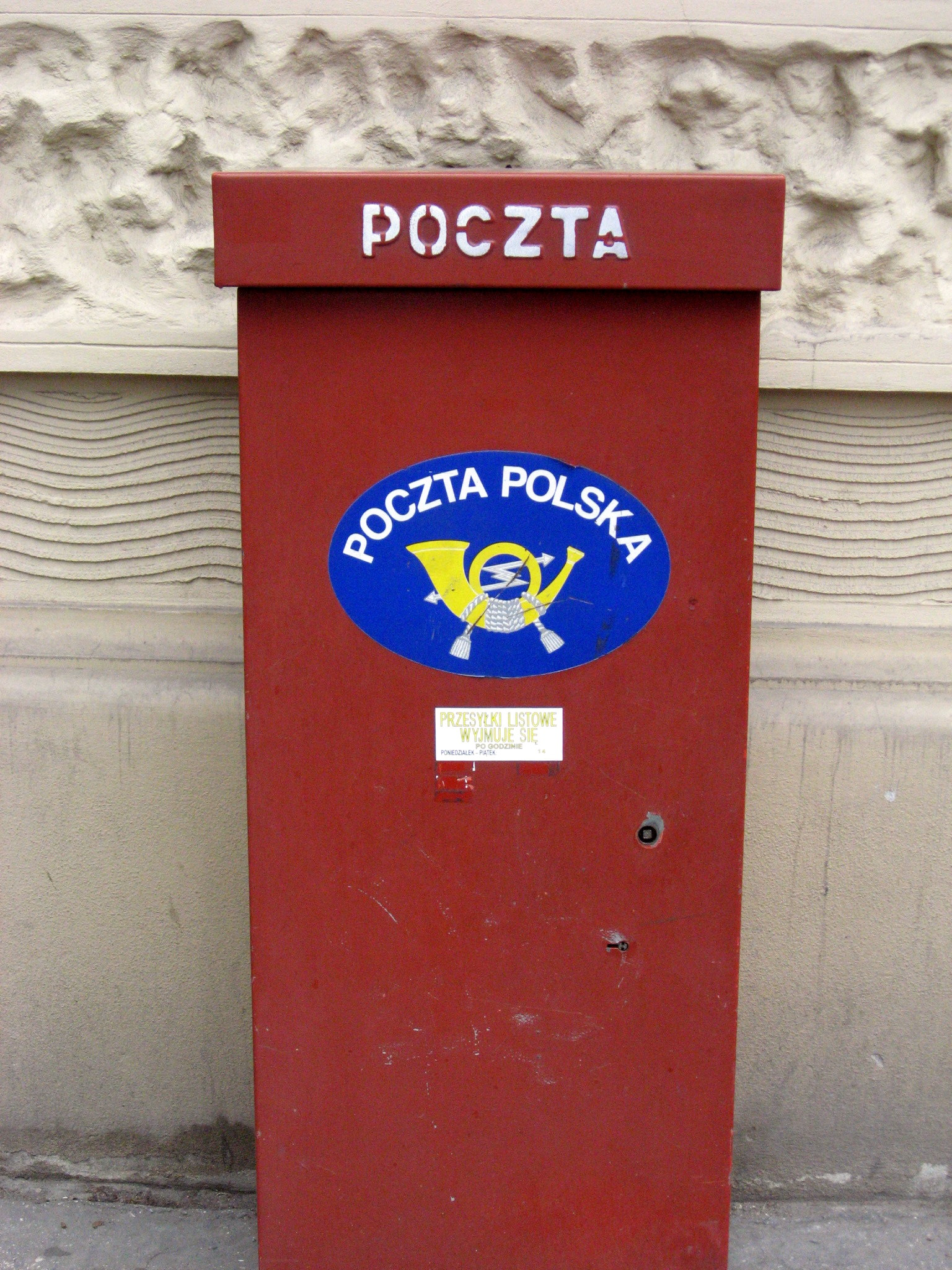
Post box in Kraków, Poland

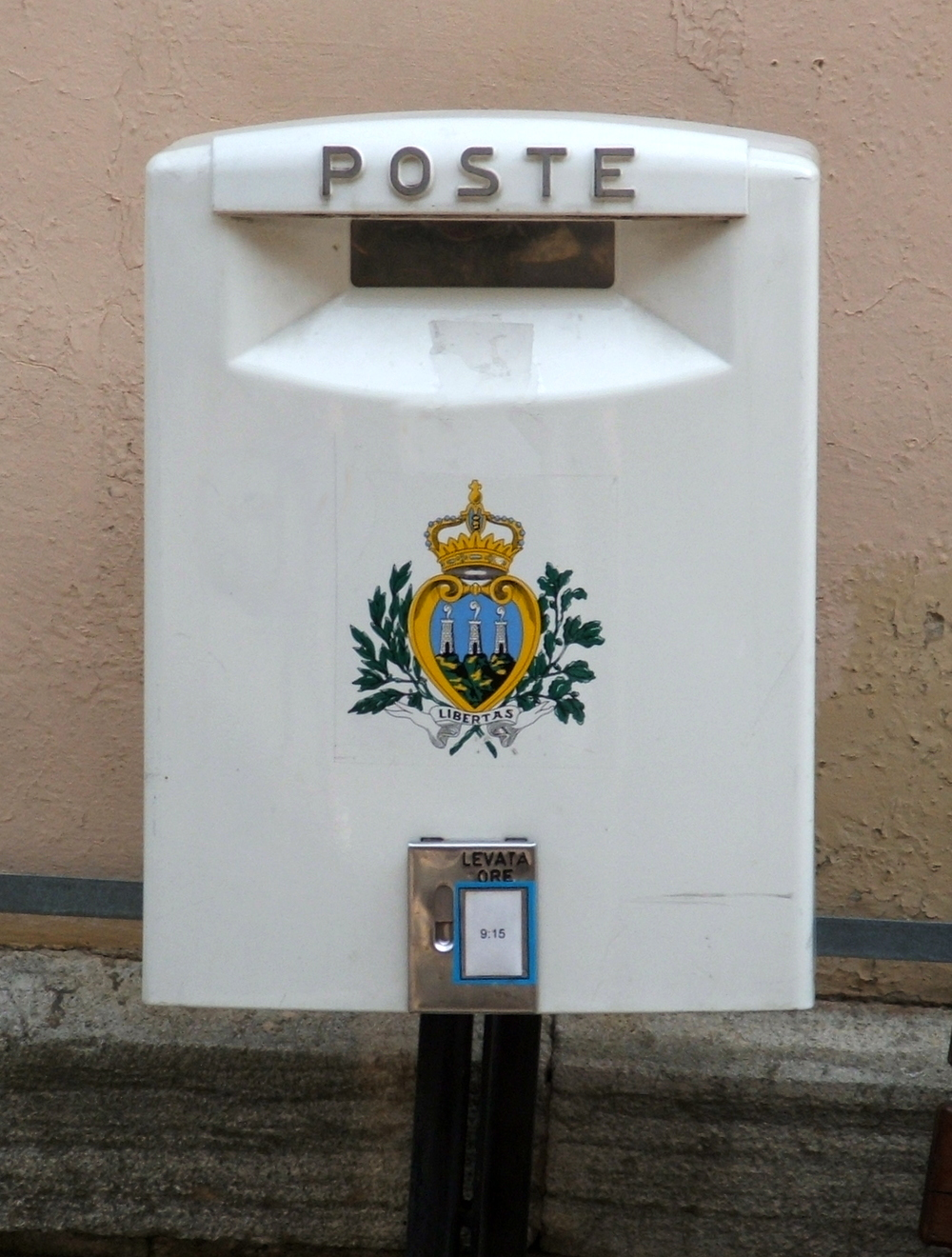
A post box in San Marino

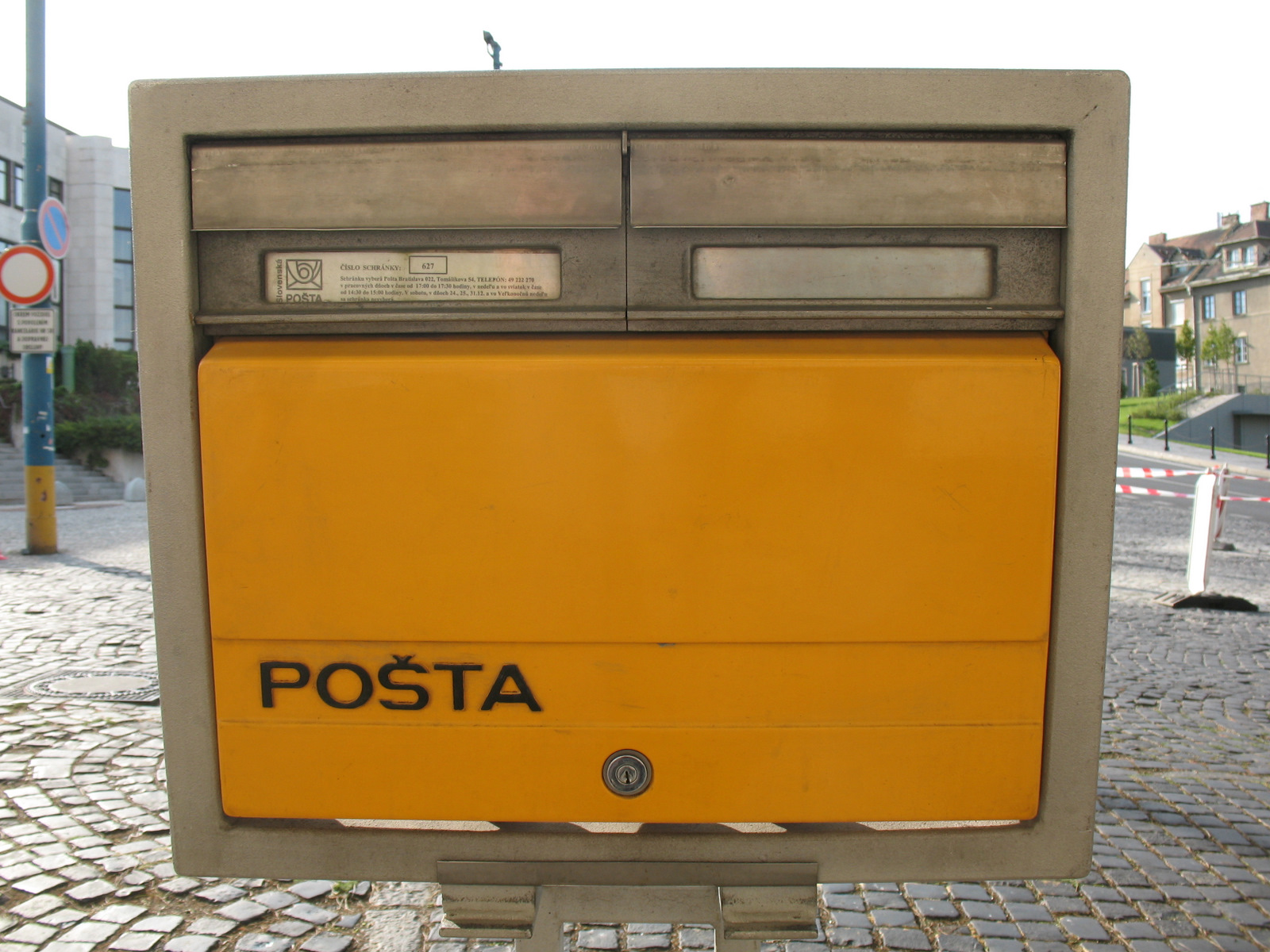
Post box in Bratislava, Slovakia

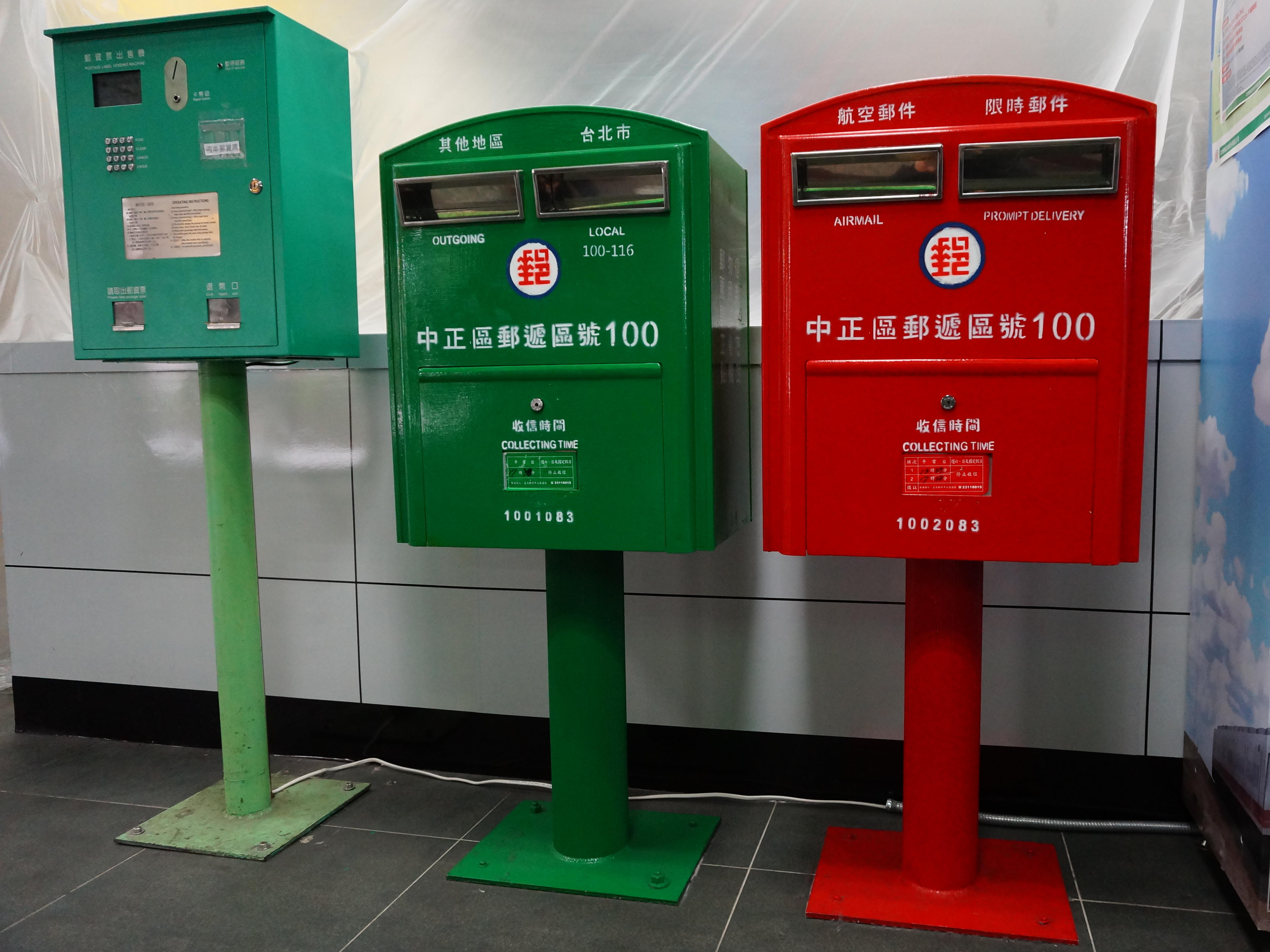
Express and international post box (red) and local mail box (green) in the Taipei Railway Station, Taiwan.

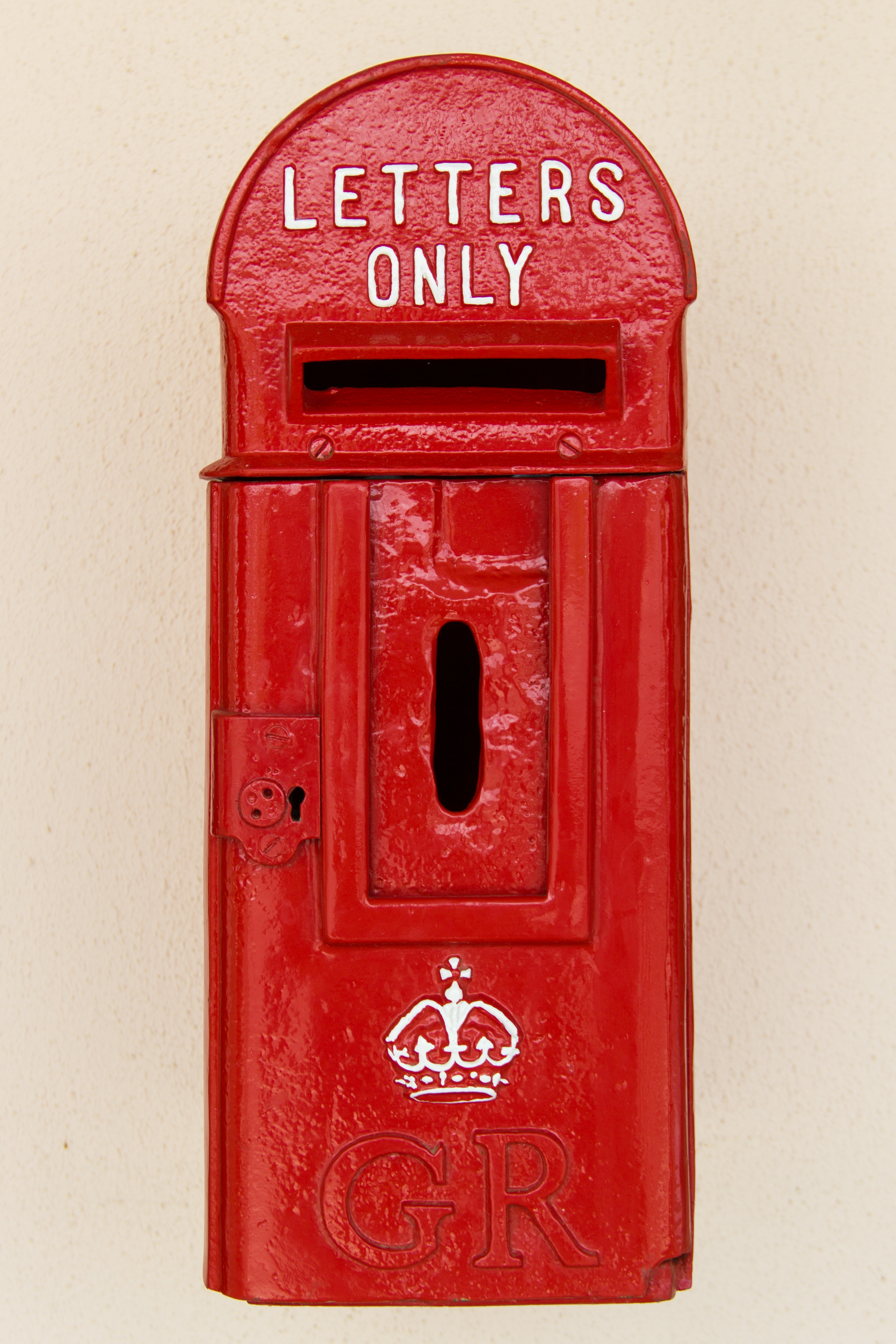
A GR Lamp Box at Cape Agulhas, the most southern post box in Africa

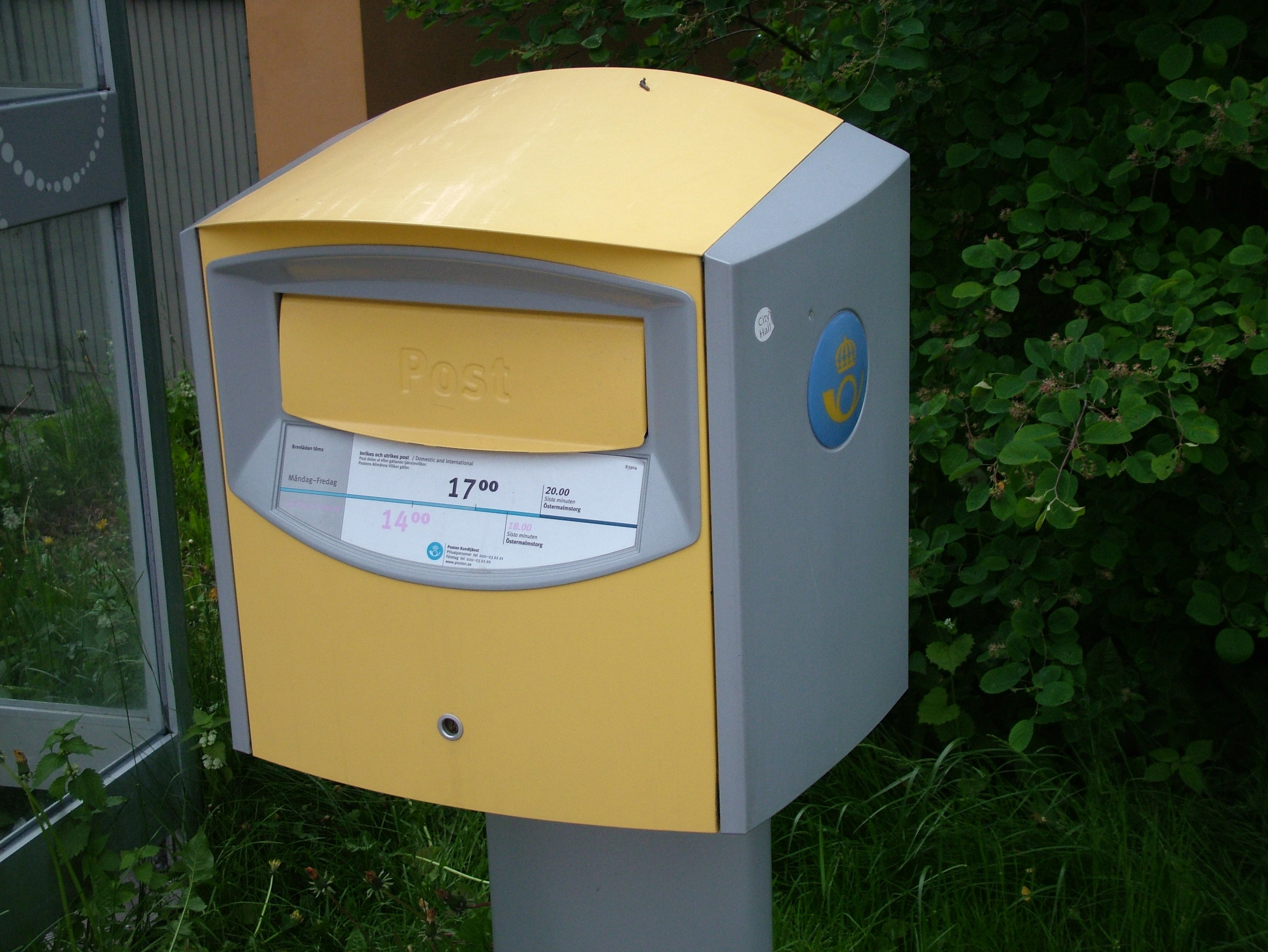
Swedish post box

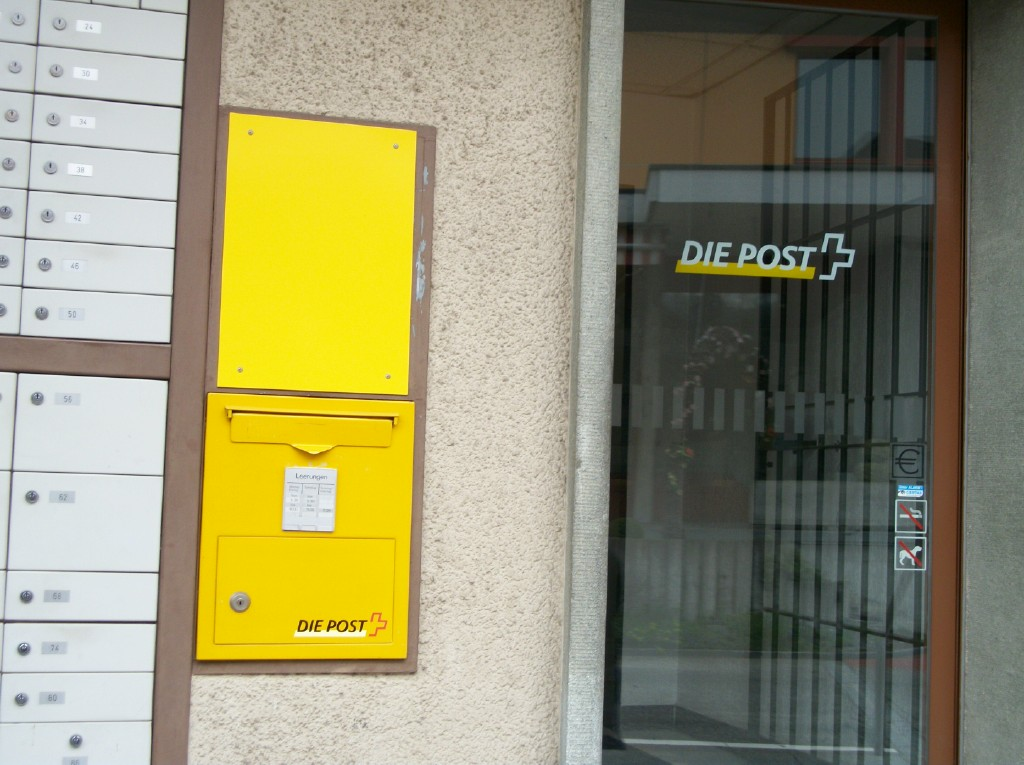
Post box in Lützelflüh-Goldbach, Switzerland

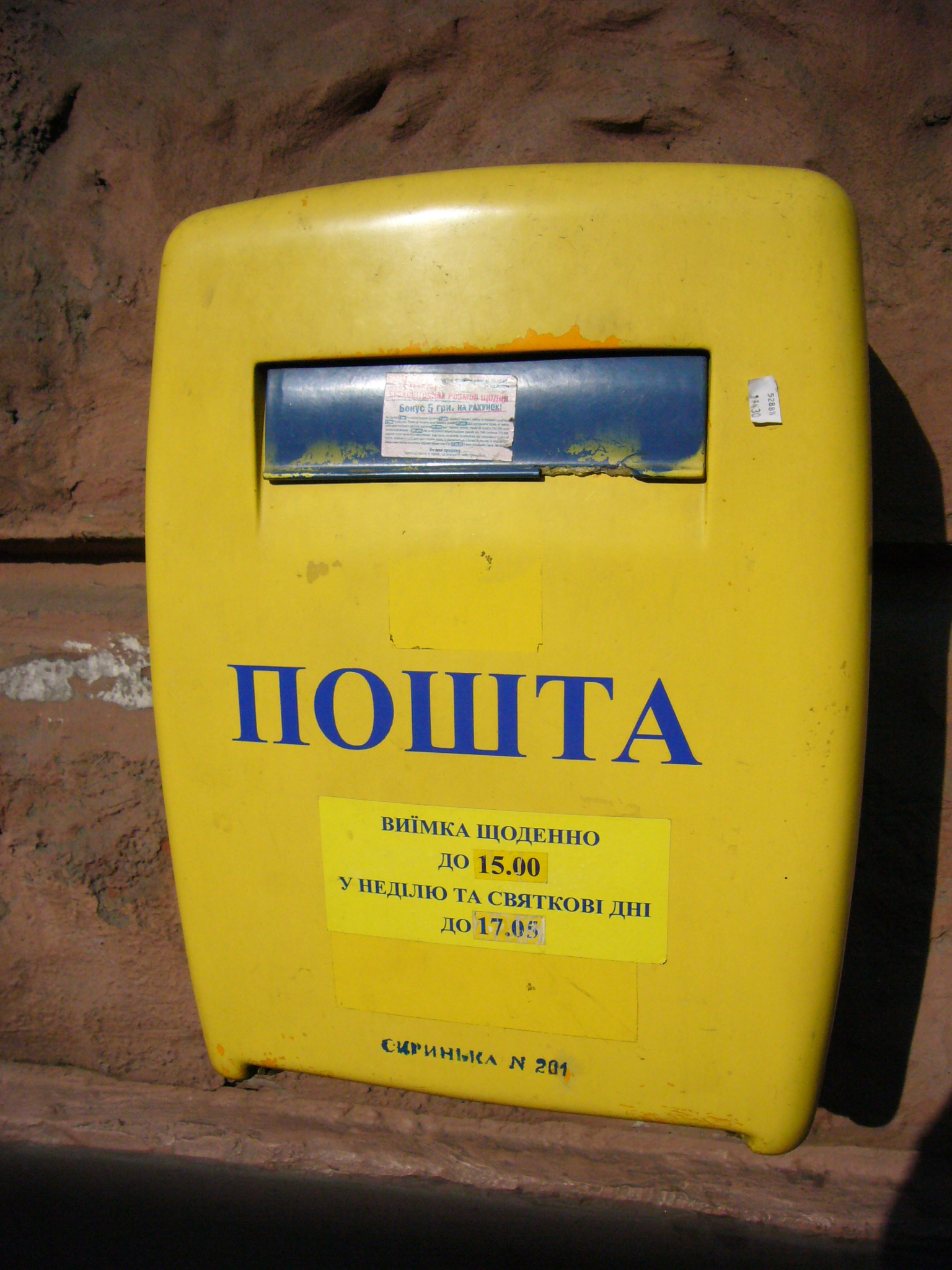
A Ukrainian post box in the city of Dnipro, Ukraine

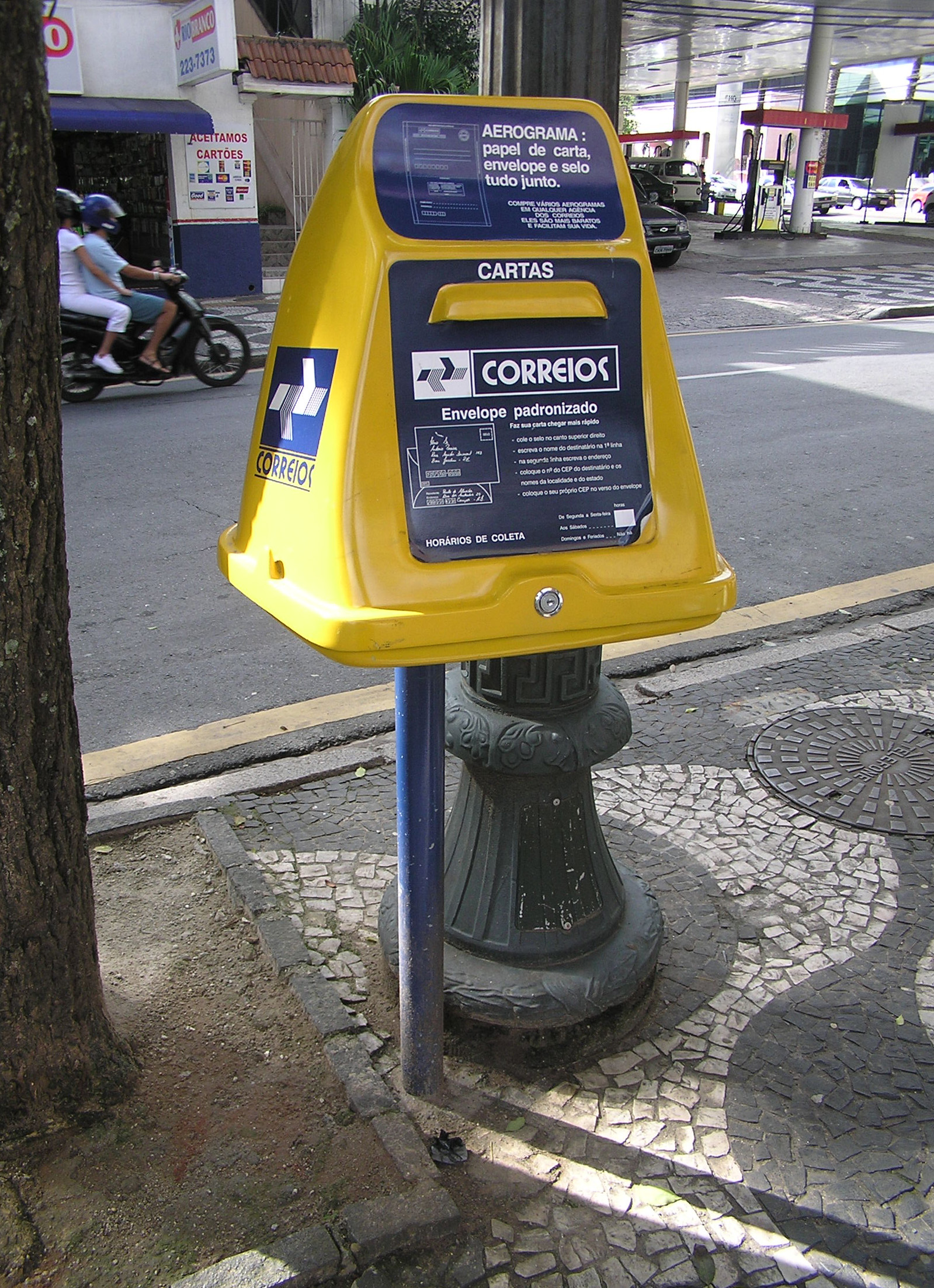
A standardized Brazilian post box, in Belo Horizonte

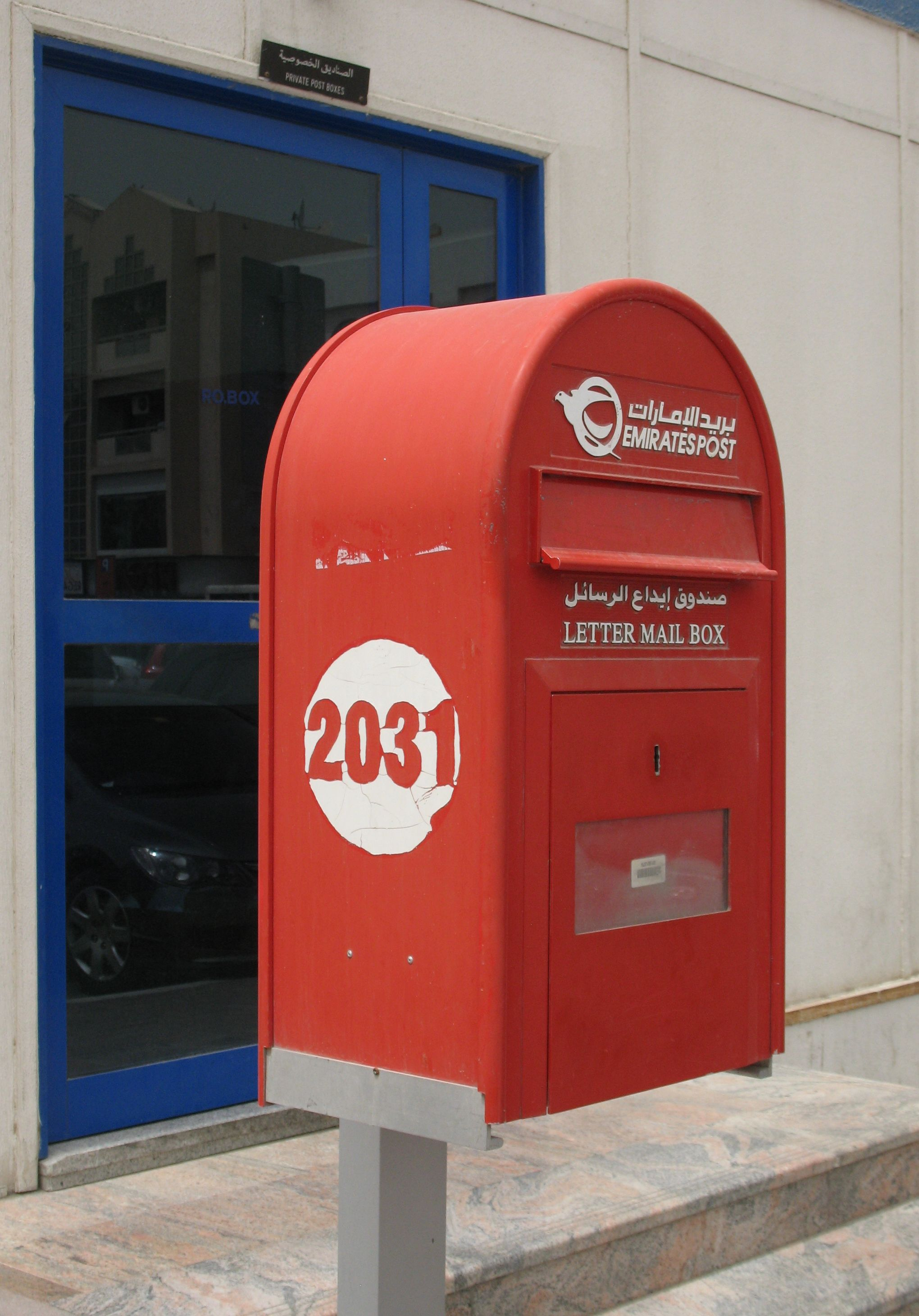
in Al Satwa in Dubai, United Arab Emirates

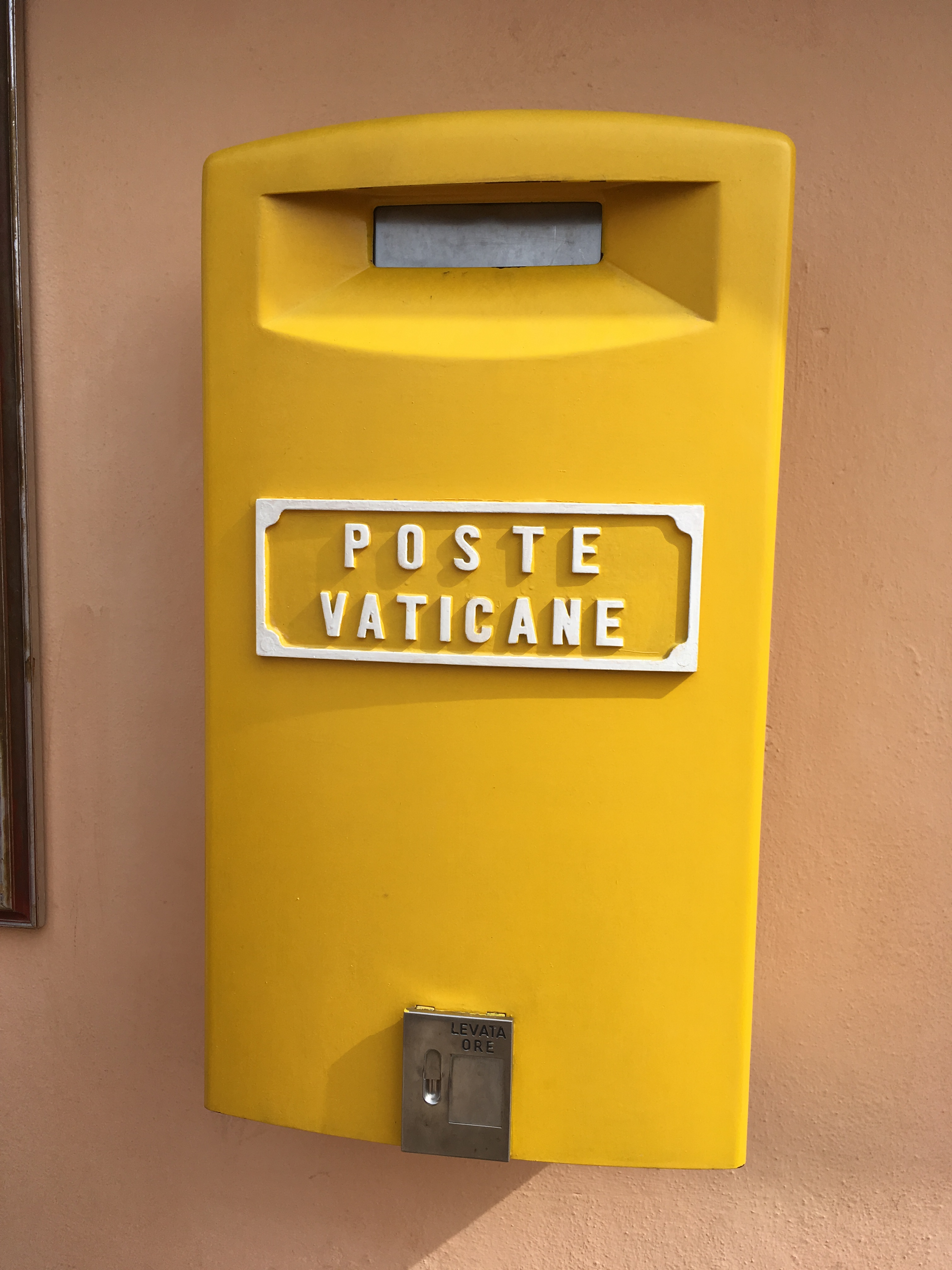
The Vatican City operates their own post offices as "Poste Vaticane" within the walls of the Vatican City. Their post boxes are similar to the Italian post boxes (red) but are painted yellow or blue.

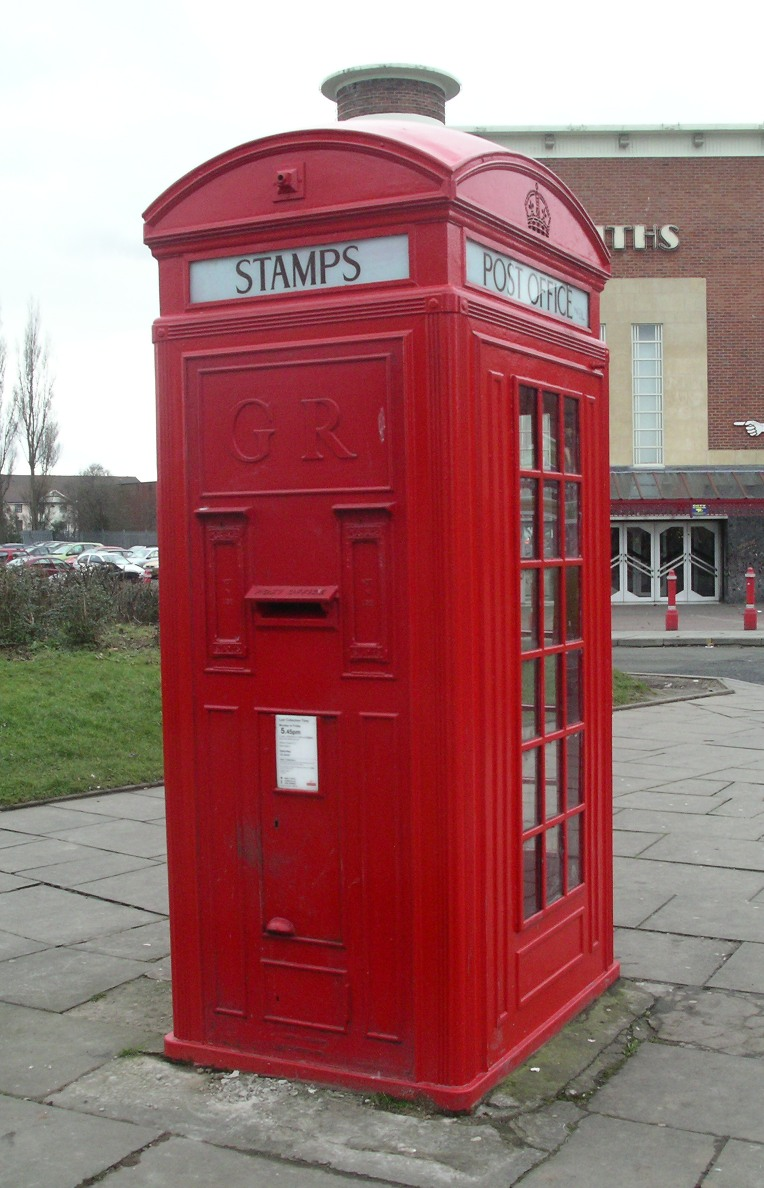
Post box incorporated into a Type K4 telephone kiosk, introduced in 1927. Ten survive in the UK of this design by Sir Giles Gilbert Scott, which also incorporates two stamp vending machines. This red telephone box is in Warrington, Cheshire, England.

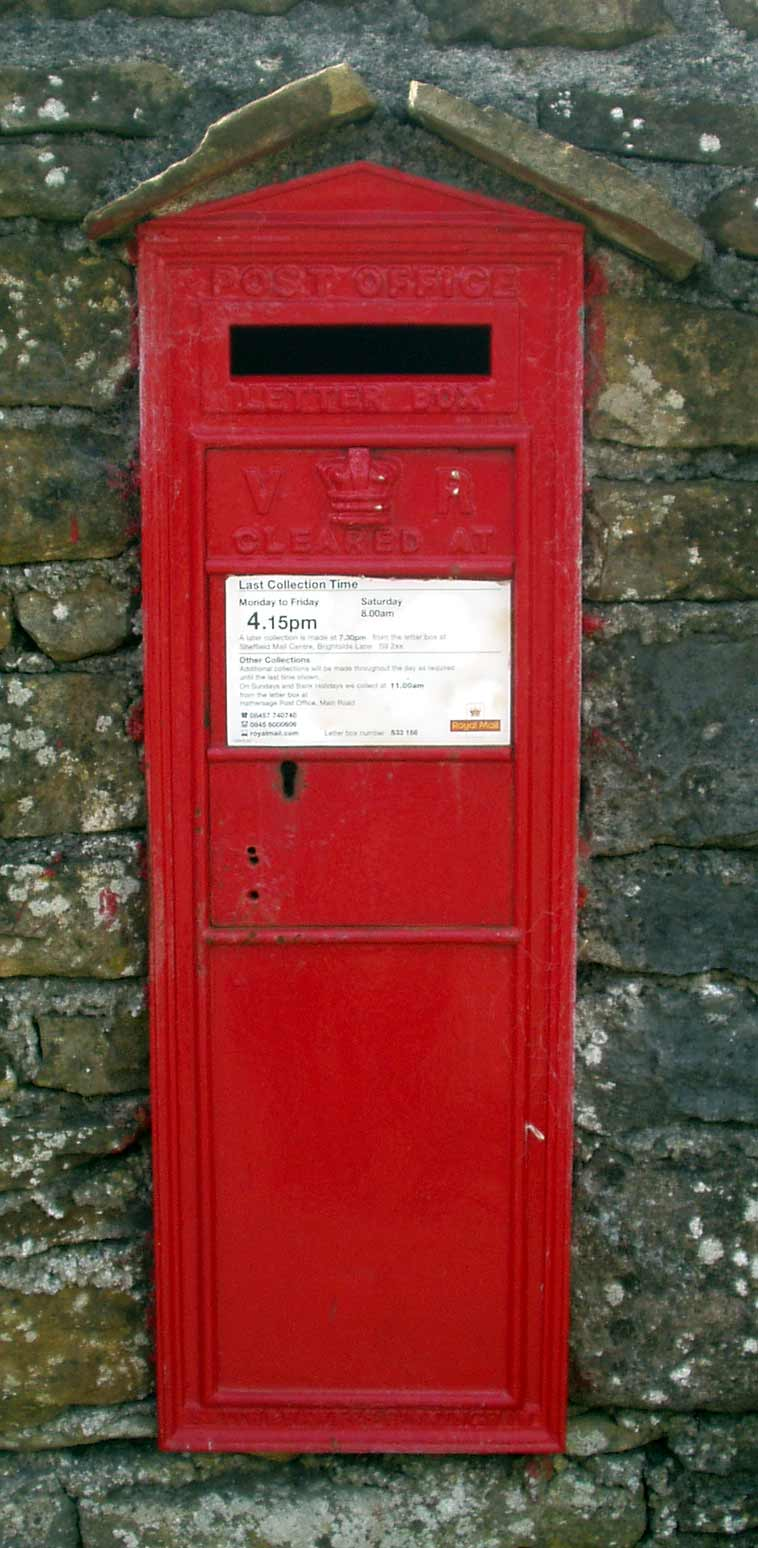
A Victorian wall box of the Second National Standard type dating from 1859, in Brough, Derbyshire, England

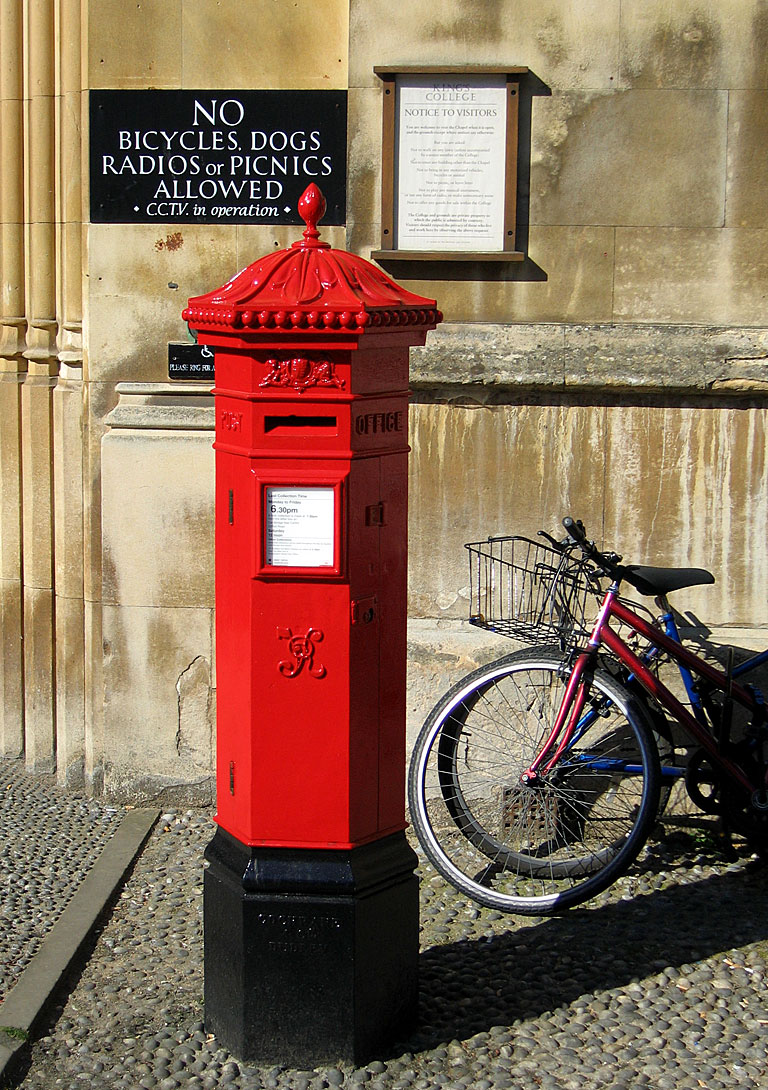
A Victorian hexagonal red post box of the Penfold type manufactured in 1866 outside King's College, Cambridge (not the original location for this box)

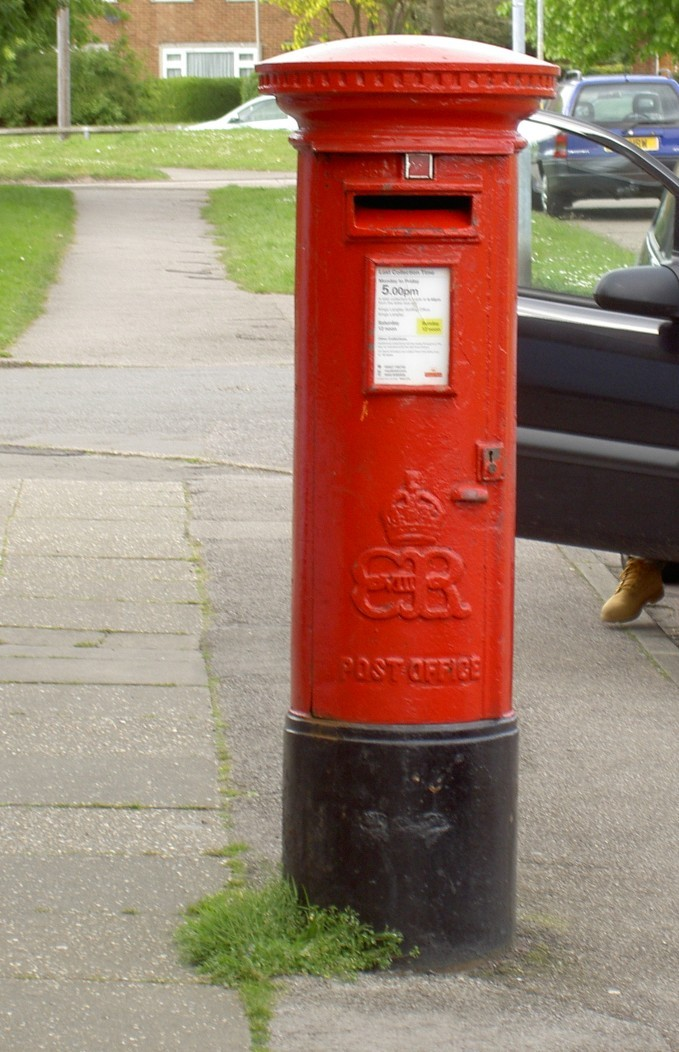
One of the 150 post boxes erected during the reign of Edward VIII

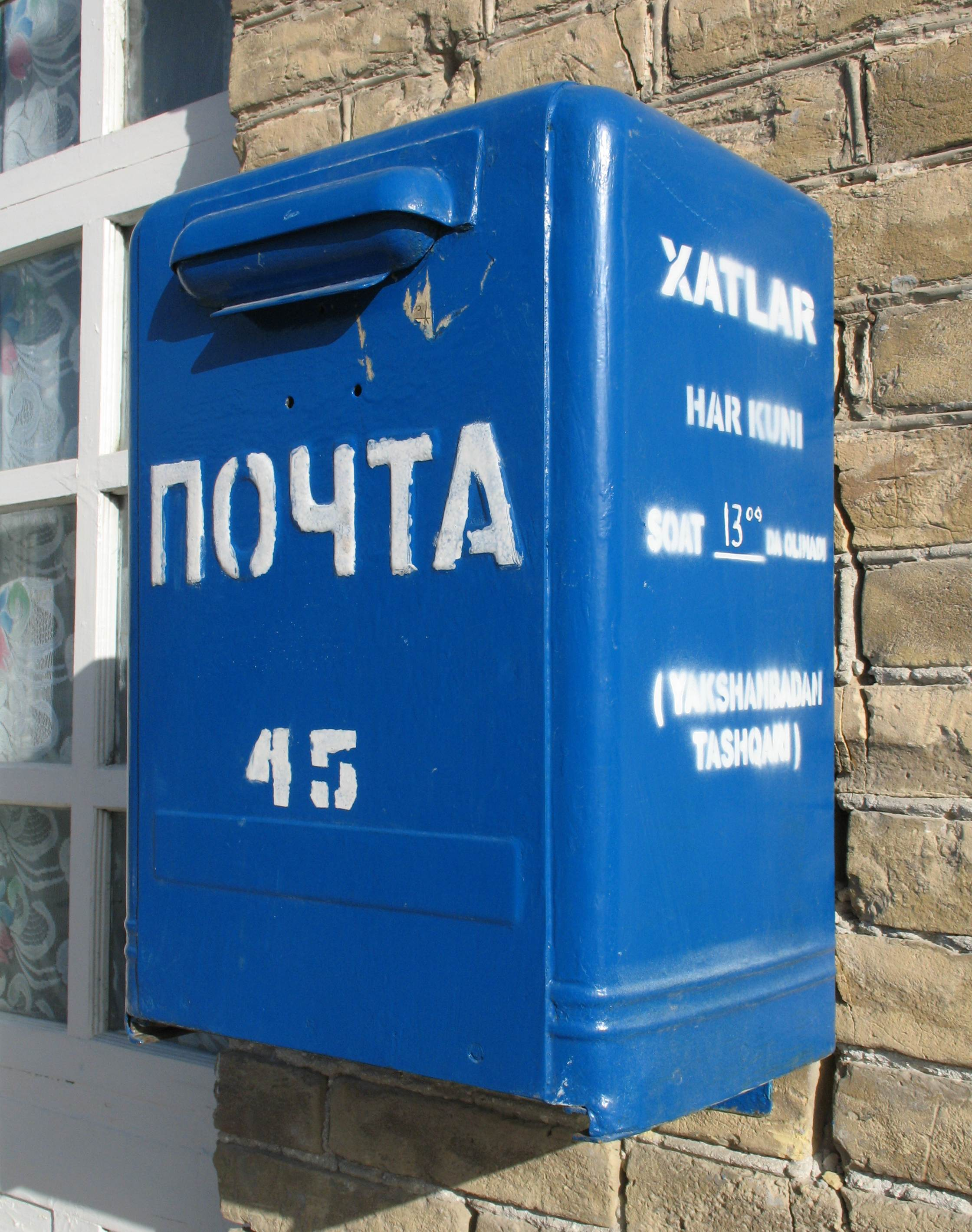
Soviet postbox in Bukhara, Uzbekistan

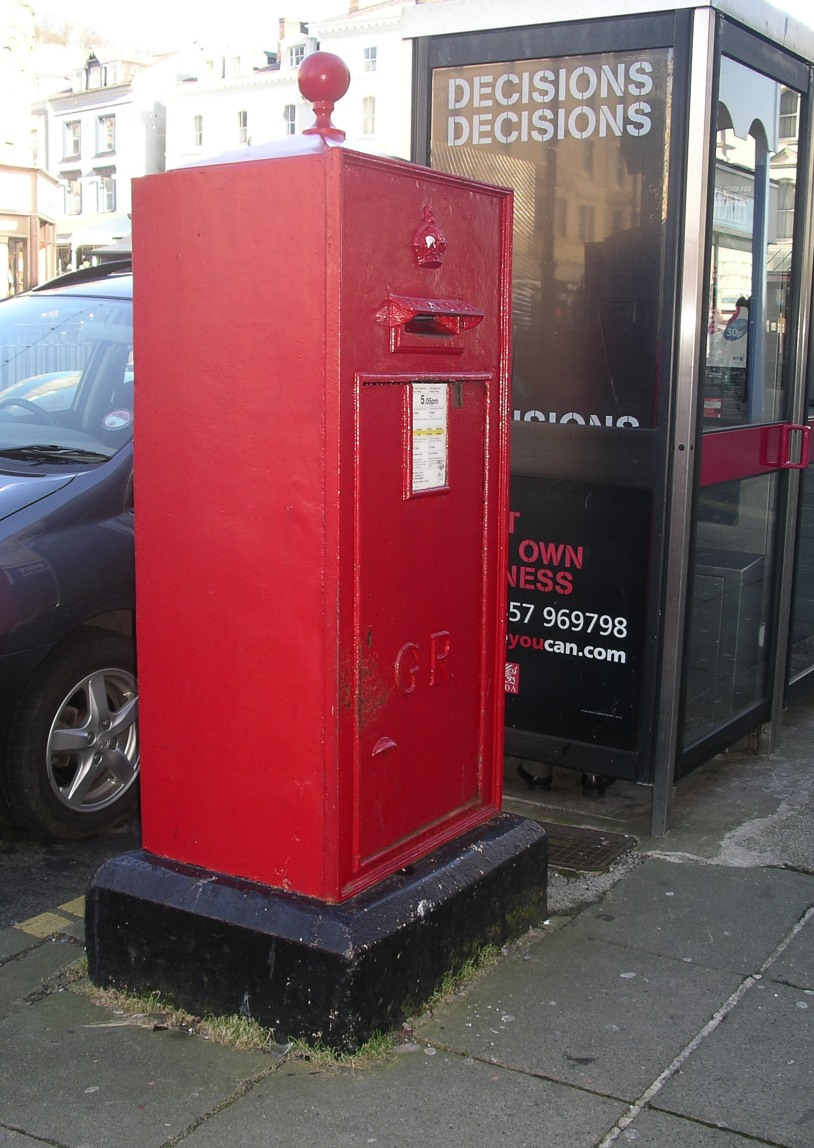
Large square pillar box (type A wall box freestanding) in Gloddaeth Street, Llandudno, Wales

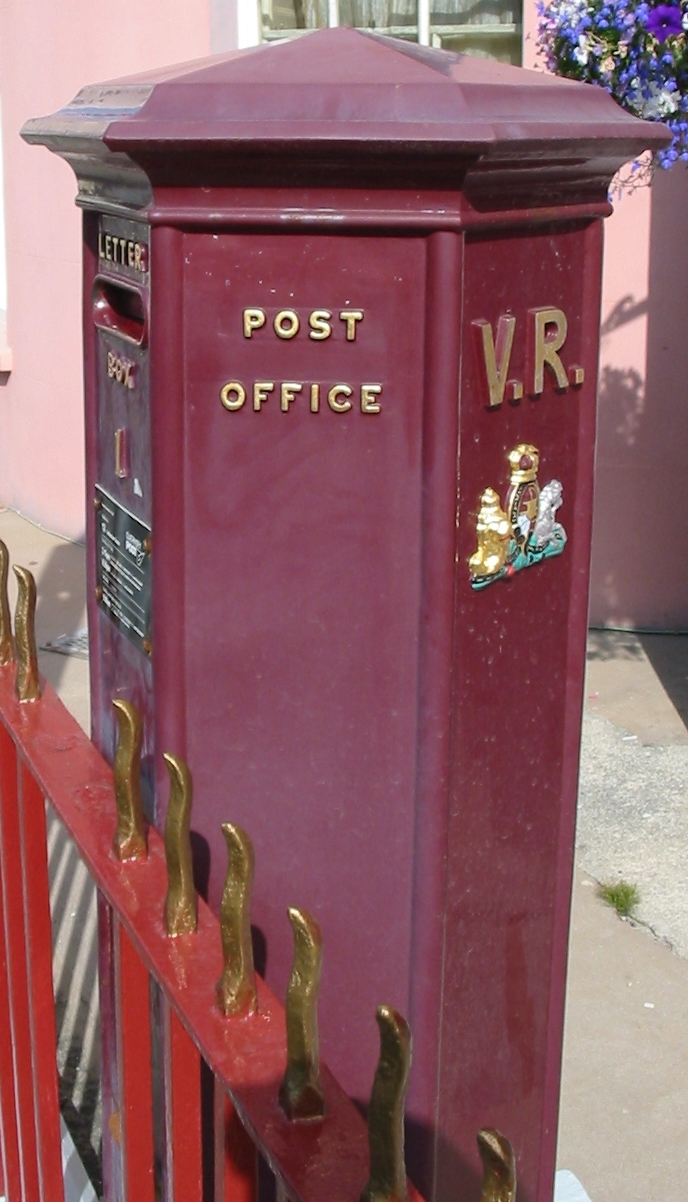
This VR pillar box was originally installed in Guernsey in 1852/53 on the recommendation of Anthony Trollope and is one of the oldest still in use.

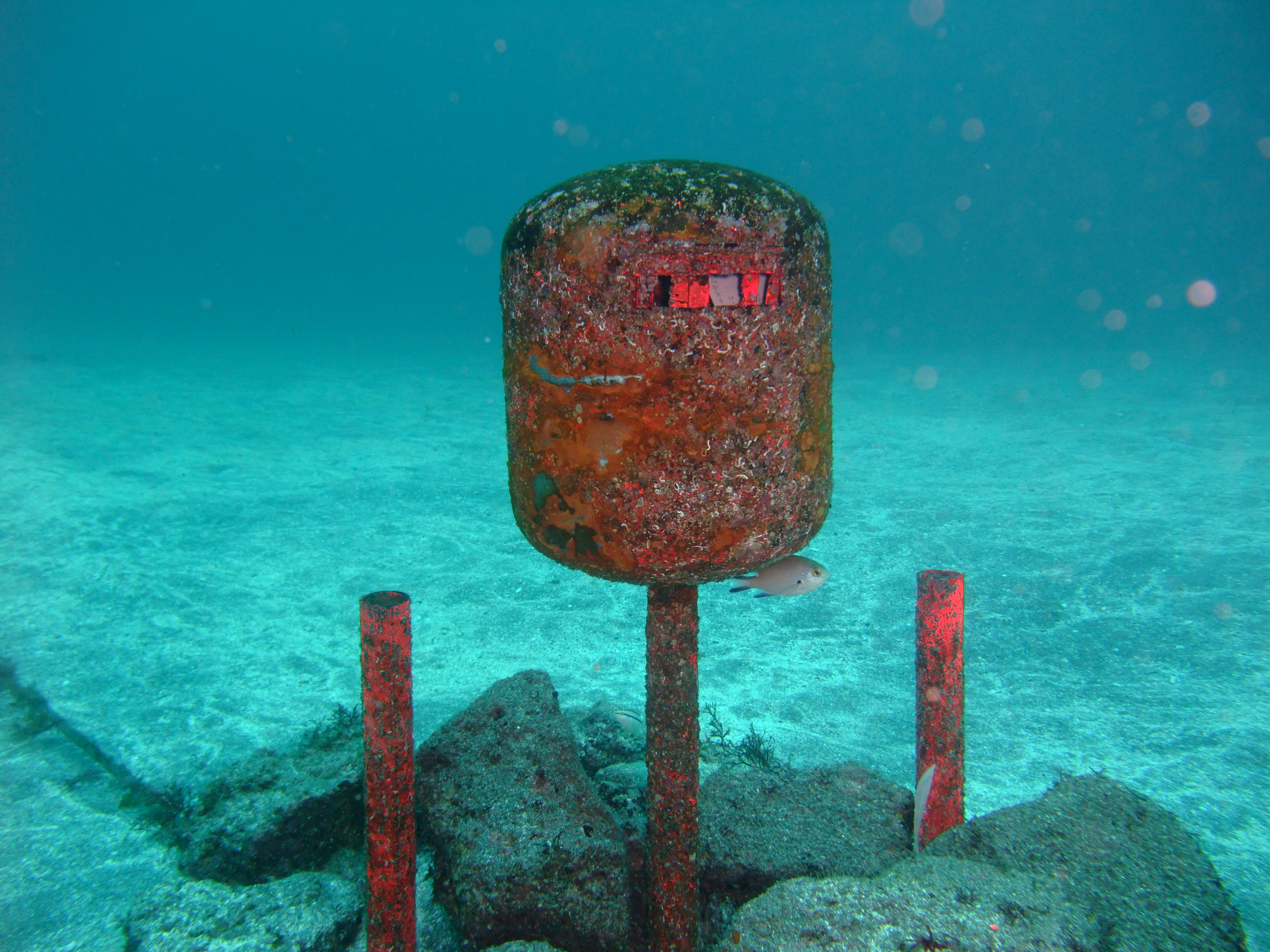
Underwater post box for divers at the Fuji-Hakone-Izu National Park, Japan

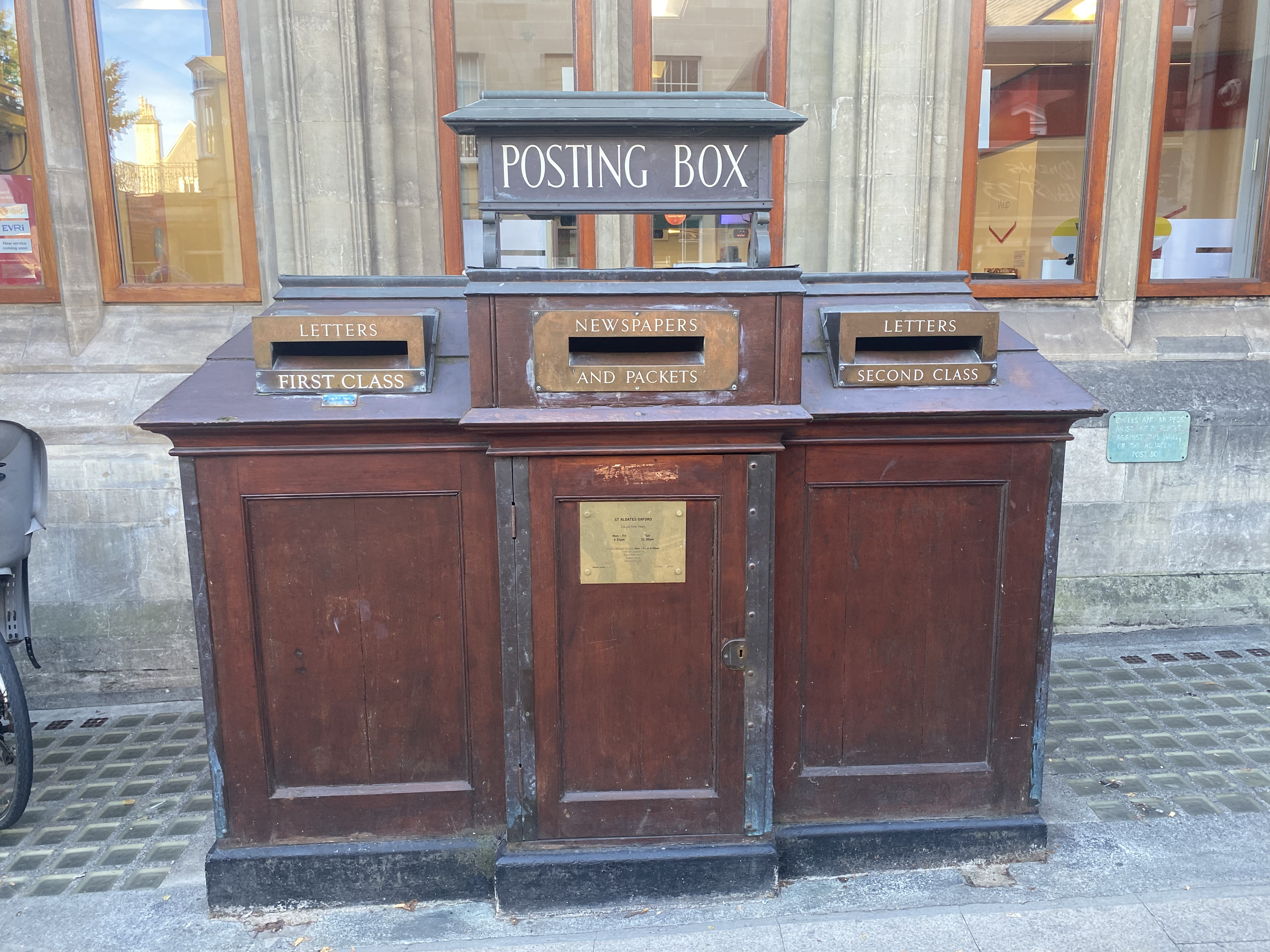
The wooden postbox in Oxford city center was erected in 1857.

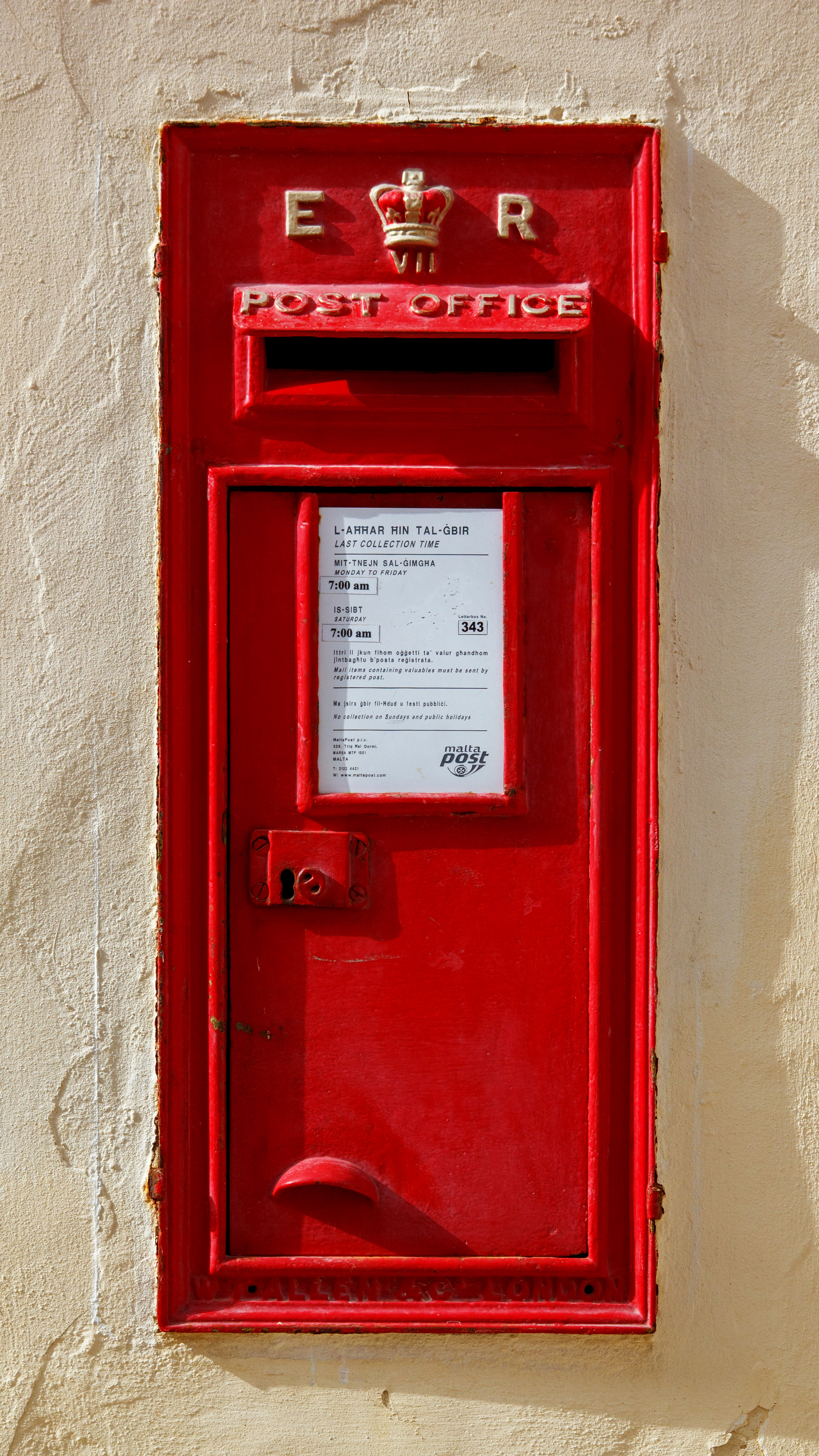
Wall mounted post box in Mdina, Malta. This is similar to the ones mounted in 1862 at Police Stations in 25 towns and villages of Malta and Gozo

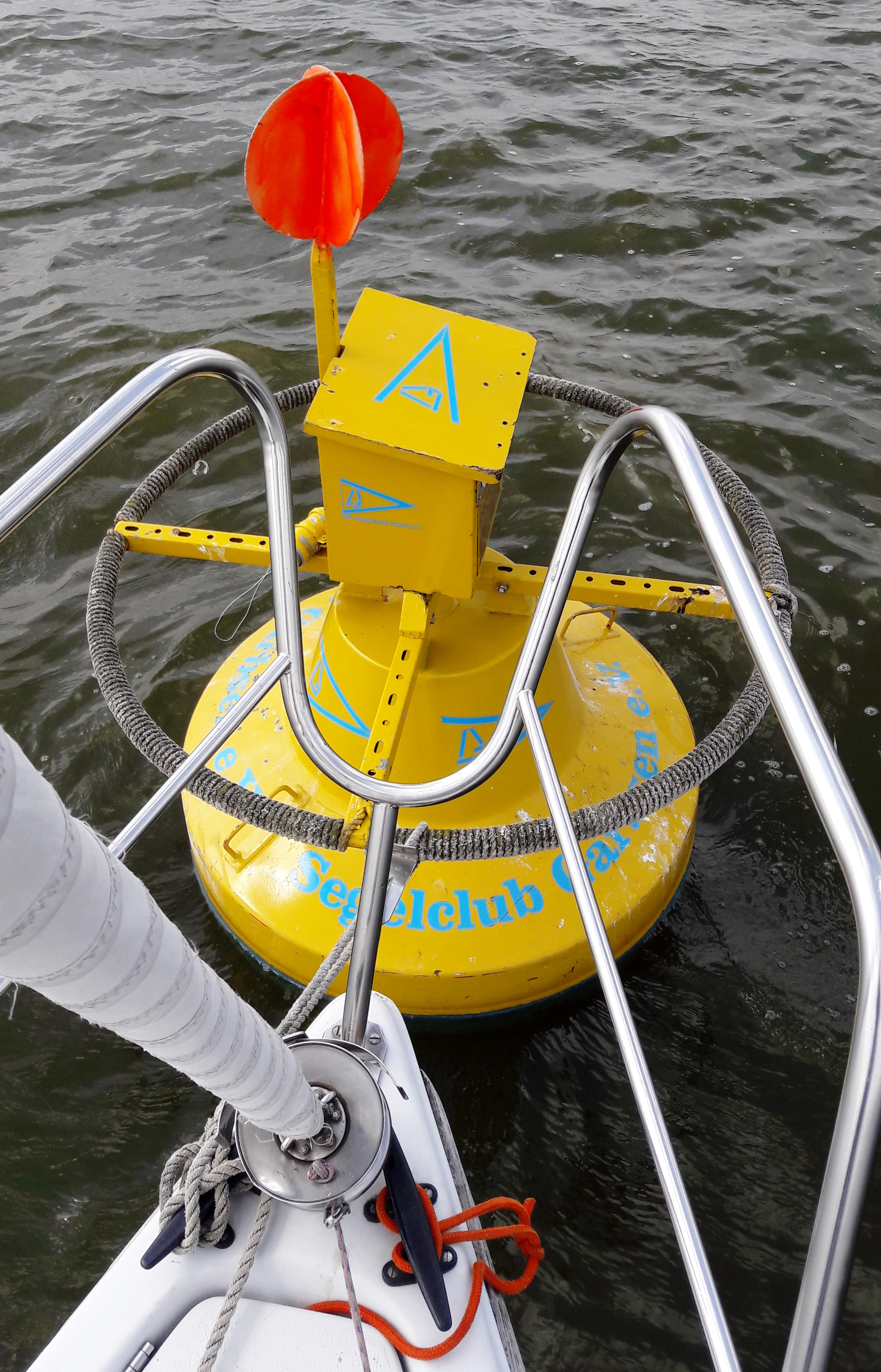
A post box on a buoy in the Steinhuder Meer, Germany

== See also ==
- General Post Office
- Parcel locker
- Post-office box, used for incoming mail
- Stamp vending machine, often attached to post boxes
- 2012 Olympics gold post boxes in the United Kingdom

== References and sources ==
=== Sources ===
Farrugia, Jean (1969). The letter box: a history of Post Office pillar and wall boxes. Fontwell: Centaur Press. p. 282. ISBN 0-900000-14-7.
