= Collection plate (postal) =

Notice plate fixed to a post box

A collection plate is a notice plate fixed to a post box giving the times of collections and days of the week on which these collections are made. They are used extensively in the UK and Commonwealth countries, as well as in most other postal administrations.

British GPO collection plates were formerly made of vitreous enamel but today, they are more usually made of plastic. Collection plates are available in a variety of sizes to fit the various styles of post box in use in Commonwealth countries, principally pillar boxes, wall boxes and lamp boxes.
