= Wall box =

Type of post box

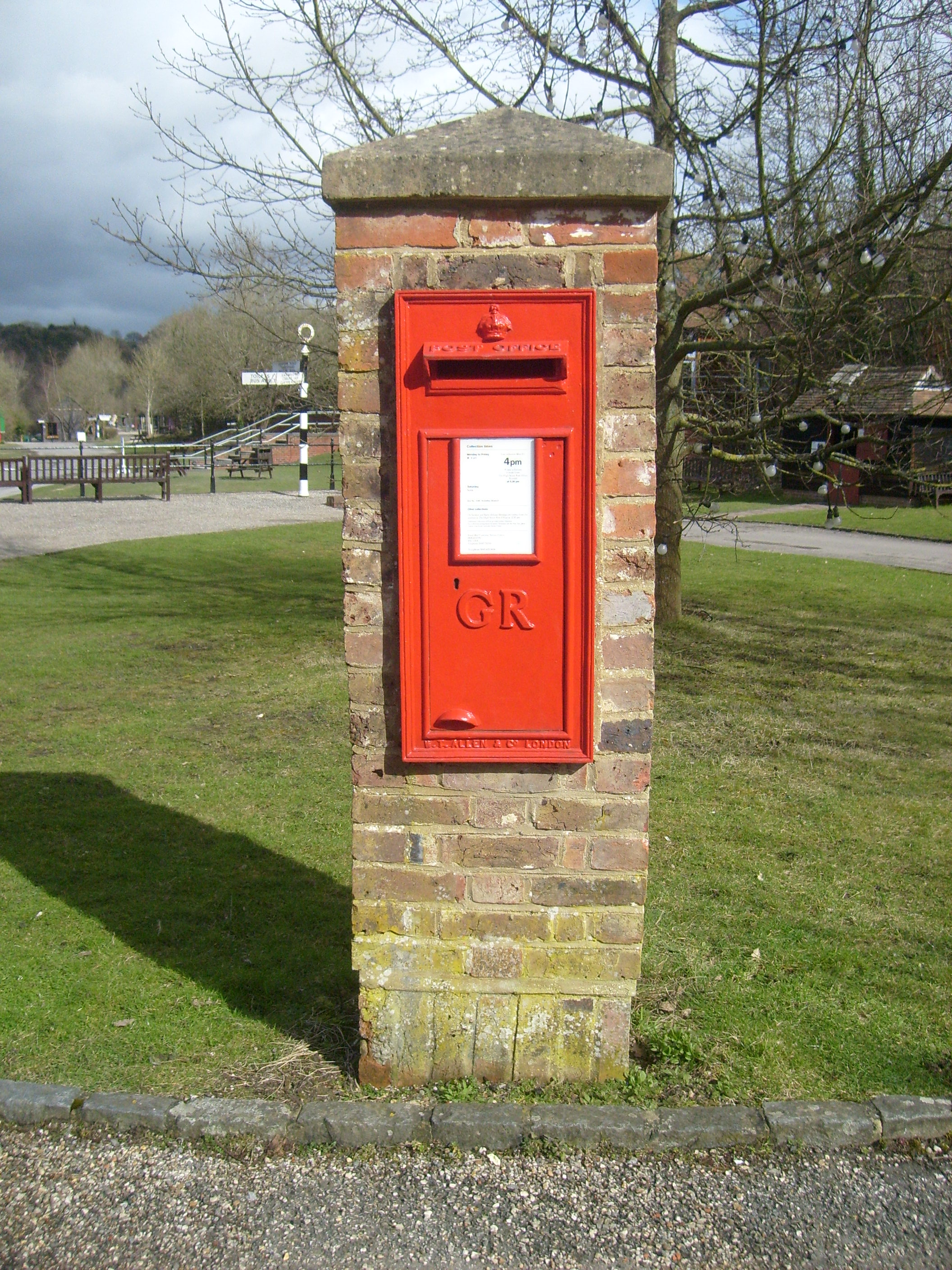
A British wall box set into a brick pillar, at the Amberley Working Museum.

Wall boxes are a type of post box or letter box found in many countries including France, the United Kingdom, the Commonwealth of Nations, Crown dependencies and Ireland. They differ from pillar boxes in that, instead of being a free-standing structure, they are generally set into a wall (hence the name) or supported on a free-standing pole, girder or other stable structure.

In the UK, UK Dependent Territories, Colonies and former Colonies and in many former British Empire countries, wall boxes usually bear the initials of the reigning monarch at the time the box was made. The first UK wall boxes were erected in 1857 in Shrewsbury and Market Drayton.

== Construction ==
Wall boxes are normally made of cast iron and are fabricated in two large castings with a third casting for the door. The rear part of the box which is set into the wall is cast as one piece, rather like an upright coffin. The whole front of the box including the aperture, royal cipher and the collection plate holder, are cast as one. There is a large opening in the front casting into which a hinged door is inserted. It is held in place by steel pins at top and bottom which locate into machined holes in the front casting. A secure 5-lever Chubb lock is fitted to all wall boxes made after 1870. Previously, narrower locks from the firm of Nettlefields were used. They are not interchangeable and this causes problems when keys are lost and locks have to be changed.

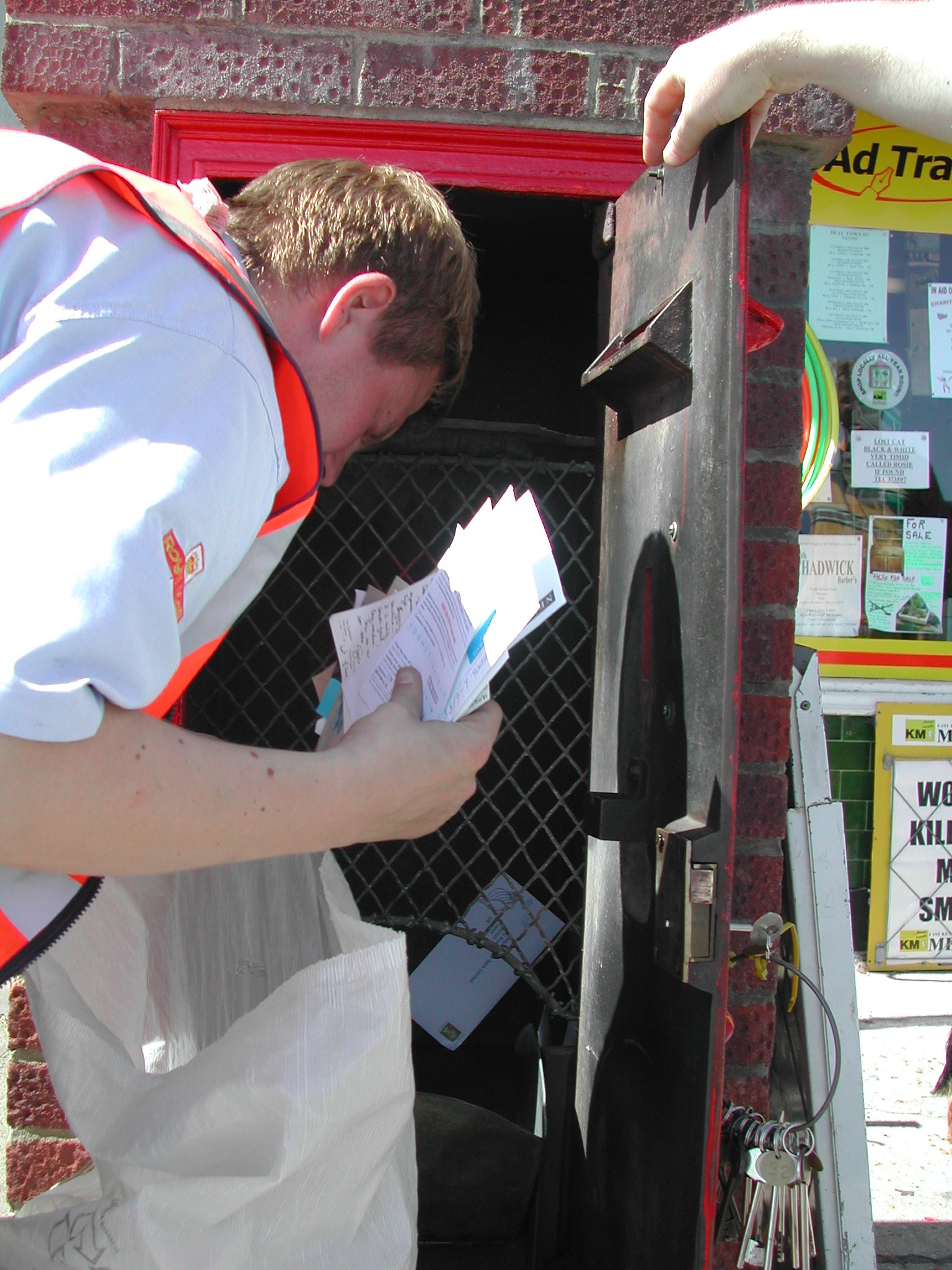
The tablet holder box and the Chubb lock are clearly visible as a postman clears mail from an 'A' size wall box in Deal, Kent

Initial examples were fitted with a simple wire tray internally over the base to raise any post off the lower surface. This was necessary because water seeped into the box through the side seams and condensation could also form on the inside, making the base rather wet. Later modifications saw this wirework extended to form a vertical barrier across the whole inside front of the box. This prevented mail from cascading out onto the ground when the door was opened for clearing the box. By 1879, UK wall boxes were also fitted with a drop-down hinged metal letter chute to help guide the stored mail into the waiting sack or basket during clearance.

An even later modification, which was then widely retro-fitted, was the provision externally of a Next Collection tablet holder to hold the square metal tablet inscribed, enamelled or printed with the time or day on which the next collection is due to be made. At the same time, internally, a tablet storage box was added to hold the remaining day or hour tablets not currently in use.

== Manufacturers ==
Many different manufacturers' names may be found on British-style wall boxes, many of which were exported around the world. Included amongst these are: Smith and Hawkes Ltd., Eagle Range & Foundry, Bernard P. Walker & Co., W.T. Allen & Co. Ltd., Carron Co., Derby Castings Ltd., Andrew Handyside & Co. Ltd.

Manufacture of cast-iron wall boxes in the UK for postal use finished in 1980.

== History ==
In 1849, the British Post Office first encouraged people to install a letter box to facilitate the delivery of mail. Before then, letterboxes of a similar design had been installed in the doors and walls of post offices for people to drop off outgoing mail. An example of such a wall box (originally installed in the wall of the Wakefield Post Office) is dated 1809 and believed to be the oldest example in Britain. It is now on display at the Wakefield Museum.

=== Queen Victoria ===
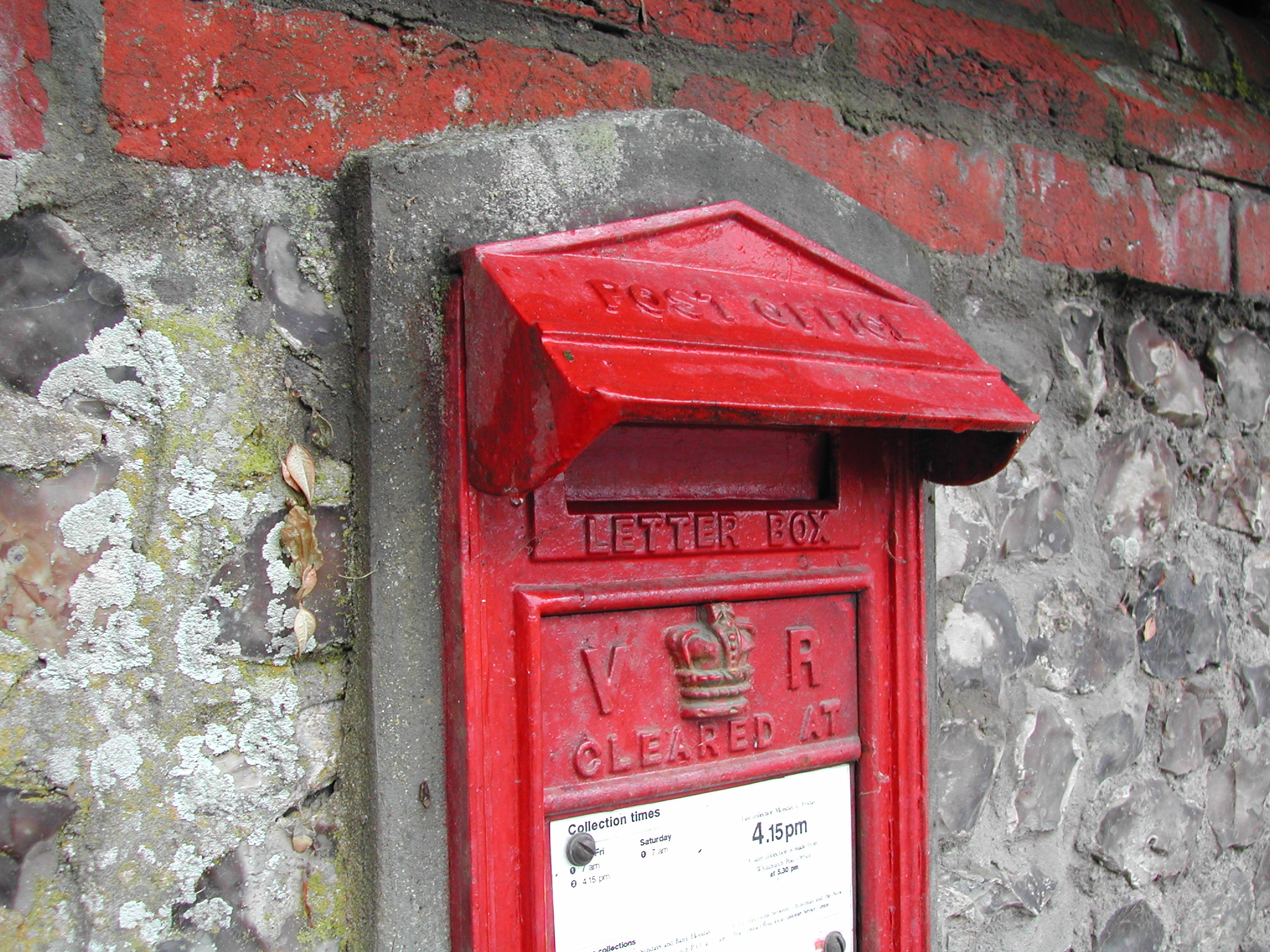
This rare Victorian 2nd National standard wall box near Andover in Hampshire has a large hood and a pedimented top to keep the rain out

Letter Box Study Group identifiers appear in brackets. The first pillar box was erected in the Channel Islands in 1852 and it was soon realised that, while successful, pillar boxes were expensive to manufacture and sometimes difficult to site. A box which could be recessed into a wall was preferred in rural areas where no pavement or street lighting existed. The First National Standard (WB74) design was made by the Birmingham, UK firm of Smith & Hawkes Ltd. and the first boxes were installed in 1857. Today, around ten survive, mostly in the West Country and West Midlands of Great Britain.

The design was seen to have several flaws which led to unacceptable ingress of water when in use in the wet British climate. A modified version, The Second National Standard (WB75 and WB76), debuted in 1859 and was more successful. A pedimented top and a large rain hood helped to keep water out of the box. Drainage holes were provided at the base to enable accumulated water to drain away easily. The doors of these two boxes were rather small and set high up the front of the box, which made clearing them awkward.

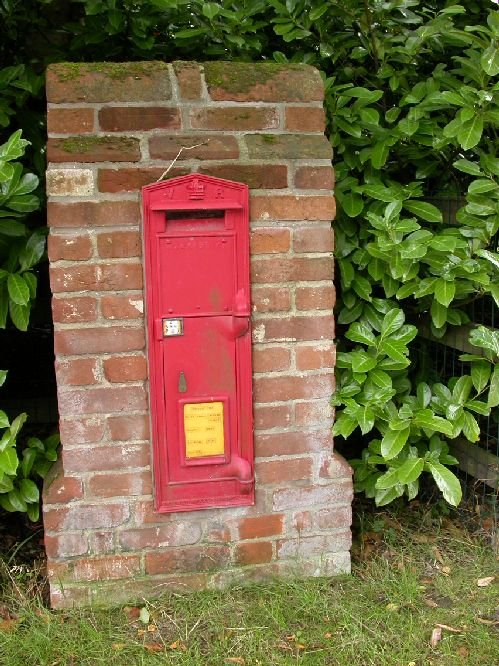
The only known example of the large 2nd National Standard wall box is at Boydon End, Wickhambrook, in Suffolk

This problem was overcome with the 1861 modification to form the Smith & Hawkes No.2 Size (WB78), in addition, a larger size, known as No.1 (WB77), was also provided. It had been trialled with the Second National Standard in very small numbers, only one of which has survived in the UK at Wickhambrook, Suffolk. There are about ten survivors of the later No.1 Large size and several hundred of the No.2 size in the UK.

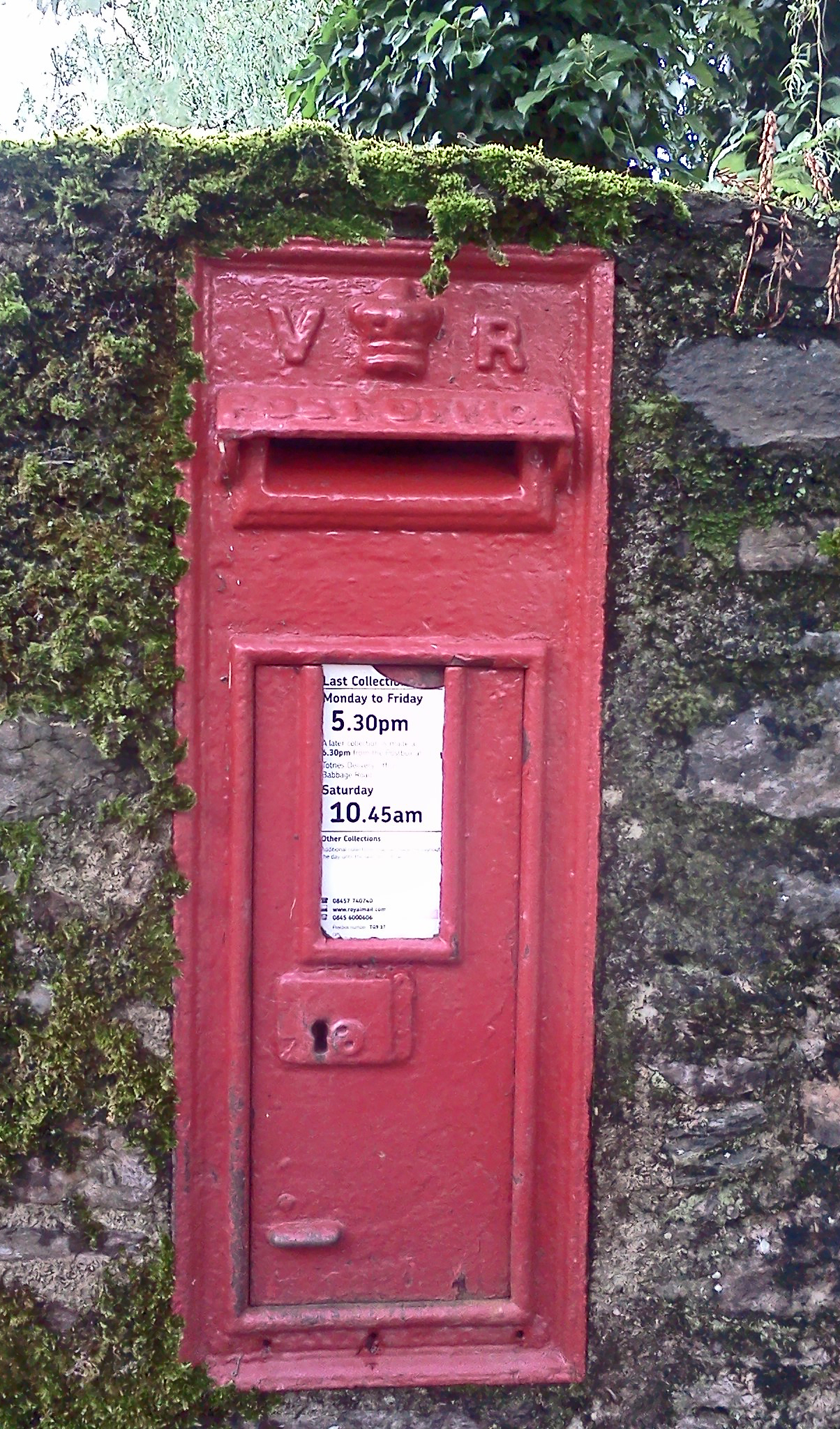
A Victorian wall box (unidentified type) near Ashprington, Devon, UK.

By moving the Collection plate from the top front of the box casting to a slot in the door, it was made much easier to change, having previously been bolted to the box front. These produced the 1871 design (WB83/1). The foundry underwent a series of ownership changes which saw Eagle Range & Foundry, Bernard P. Walker and even a combination of these two incised into the box maker's plate at the foot of the door (WB83/2-83/5).

The Eagle Range & Foundry boxes of the mid-1880s were made with smooth recessed collection plates and small neat VR cipher and crown. The contract passed to W.T. Allen in 1886 with the production of the "odd" size C box (WB86), which should have been 10 inches (25 cm) wide and 13 inches (33 cm) deep, but was actually 13 inches (33 cm) wide and only 10 inches (25 cm) deep. Only 70 were made before this mistake was rectified, with the introduction in 1887 of the Queen Victoria Jubilee boxes. This series comprised three sizes with the largest now designated A, the medium size (formerly No.1) now B and the small one (formerly No.2) Type C (WB84, WB85, WB87). This trend remained the same for the next 75 years.

=== King Edward VII ===
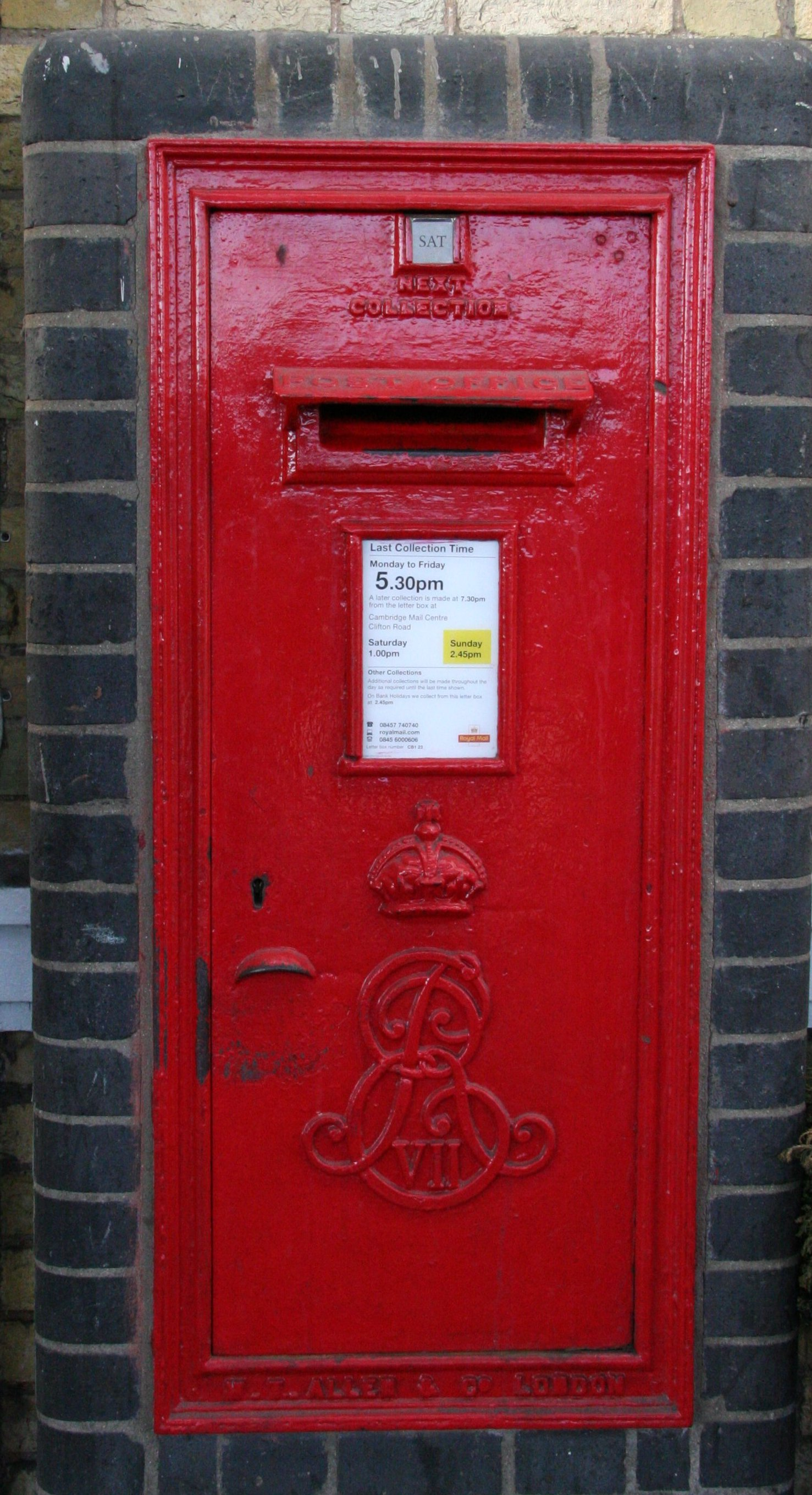
A very good example of the Type A wall box with a full Edward VII Scroll type cipher at Cambridge Railway Station

Early Edwardian wall boxes used the Victorian patterns, modified to show an "E" instead of a "V", but retaining the Imperial State Crown from the Victorian boxes. This was modified in 1905 to correctly show the Tudor Crown of King Edward VII. Later still, a full "scroll cipher" was used on all but the smallest boxes.

=== King George V ===
During this long reign many thousands of wall boxes were installed. Of note are the free-standing wall boxes of Size A for use on the street and the introduction of boxes with rear-opening doors, designated Types D, E and F respectively, for use in sub-post offices. Included in these are the Type E boxes made respectively in:
WB106/1 1932 by Andrew Handyside & Co. of Derby
WB106/2 1933 by Derby Castings Ltd.
WB106/3 1934-6 by W.T. Allen & Co. Ltd. of London
which cause a lot of confusion for those photographing and studying them as they are identical save for the Maker's name on the base which may be obscured by 75 years' worth of paint. All have the larger GR cipher positioned low on the door, whereas earlier GR boxes by W.T. Allen 1910-25 have a smaller cipher set much higher on the door, so that the top of the cipher almost abuts the collection plate holder. Similar difficulties are encountered when trying to identify the corresponding B size wall boxes from this period.

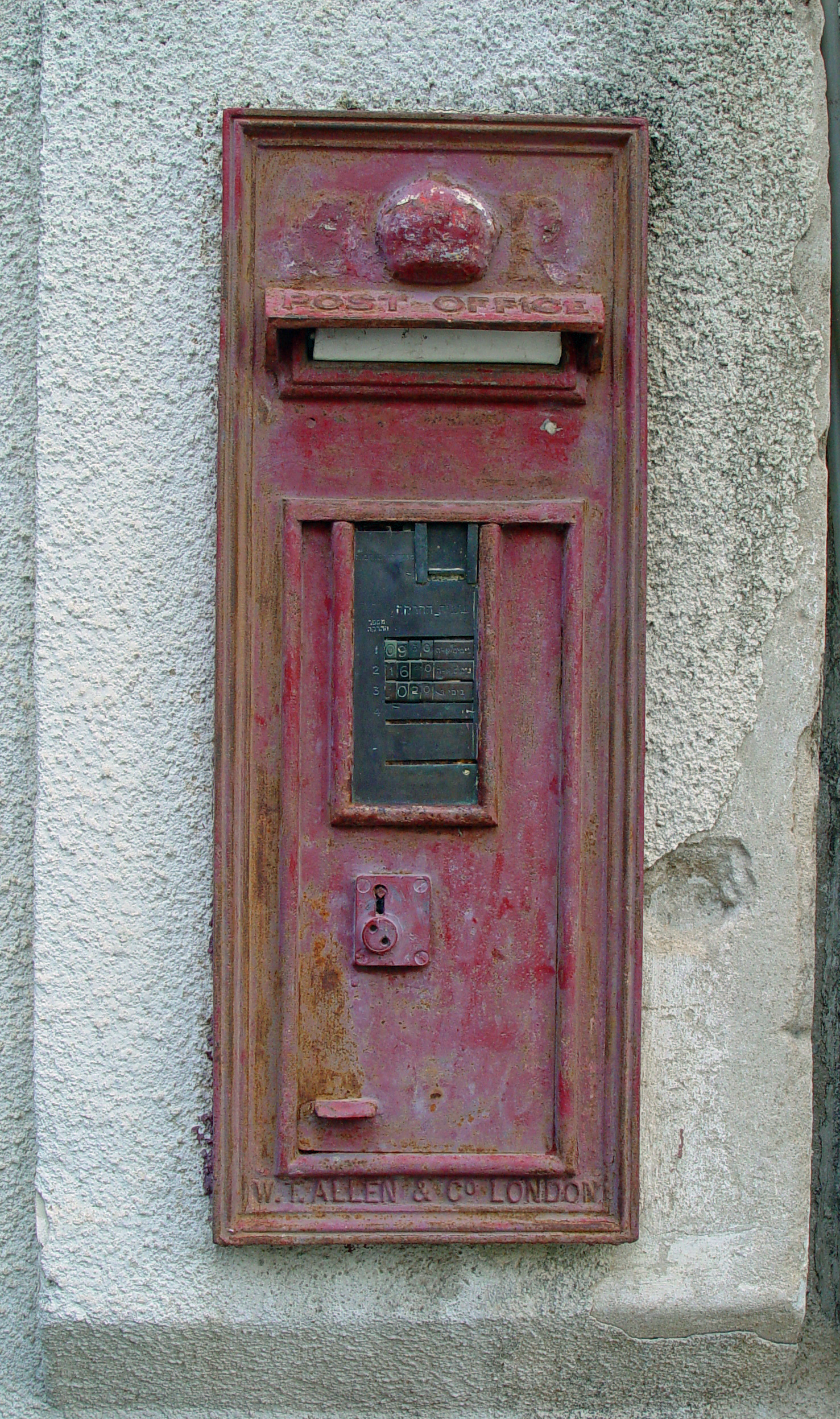
Wall box Made by W.T. Allen & Co. Ltd., situated in Hod HaSharon (Israel) former post office. It was constructed by the British Mandate authorities, and later used by the Israeli Post Office which changed the collection plate. Traces of Royal cypher "GR" are still visible.

As noted, a few wall boxes are, confusingly, free-standing, such as that outside Vollams Newsagents (formerly a post-office) in Gloddaeth Street, Llandudno. These large A size boxes were designed specially to be free-standing and include additionally, a large cast-iron base and an attractive pedimented top surmounted by a ball. A well-known example was situated at Waterloo station in London until removal in the late 1990s and subsequent restoration at the Isle of Wight Postal Museum. In other areas of the UK, such as East Anglia and the West Country, standard wall boxes have been mounted on steel girders or poles where no suitable wall exists.

=== King Edward VIII ===
As Edward, Prince of Wales abdicated in November 1936 without ever reaching his coronation, only a handful of post boxes were made carrying his Royal Cipher. Of these, 200 were pillar boxes, 70 were Ludlow style wall boxes and just 11 were cast iron wall boxes. Following the Abdication Crisis in late 1936, resentment and bad feeling led to the removal or exchange of many of the doors of these boxes. Today none exists in their original form, save for one Ludlow wall box at Bawdsey in Suffolk. Unfortunately the original enamel plate on this box was stolen and the plate seen on the box today is a modern replica.

=== King George VI ===
With the accession of Prince Albert Edward as King George VI in 1936, the GPO continued to use up stocks of George V doors as these were simply marked "GR" with no regnal number. It was not until summer 1937 that boxes began to appear bearing the newly approved Royal Cipher of King George VI. This featured a scroll typeface with Roman numerals for the regnal number surmounted by the Tudor crown. The contract for wall boxes resided at this time with W.T. Allen & Co. Ltd. of London for the "B" and "E" size boxes and with Carron Co. of Falkirk Scotland for the "A" and "D" sizes and remained with them throughout this reign. By this time, production of the type "C" and "F" size boxes had been discontinued.

=== Elizabeth II ===
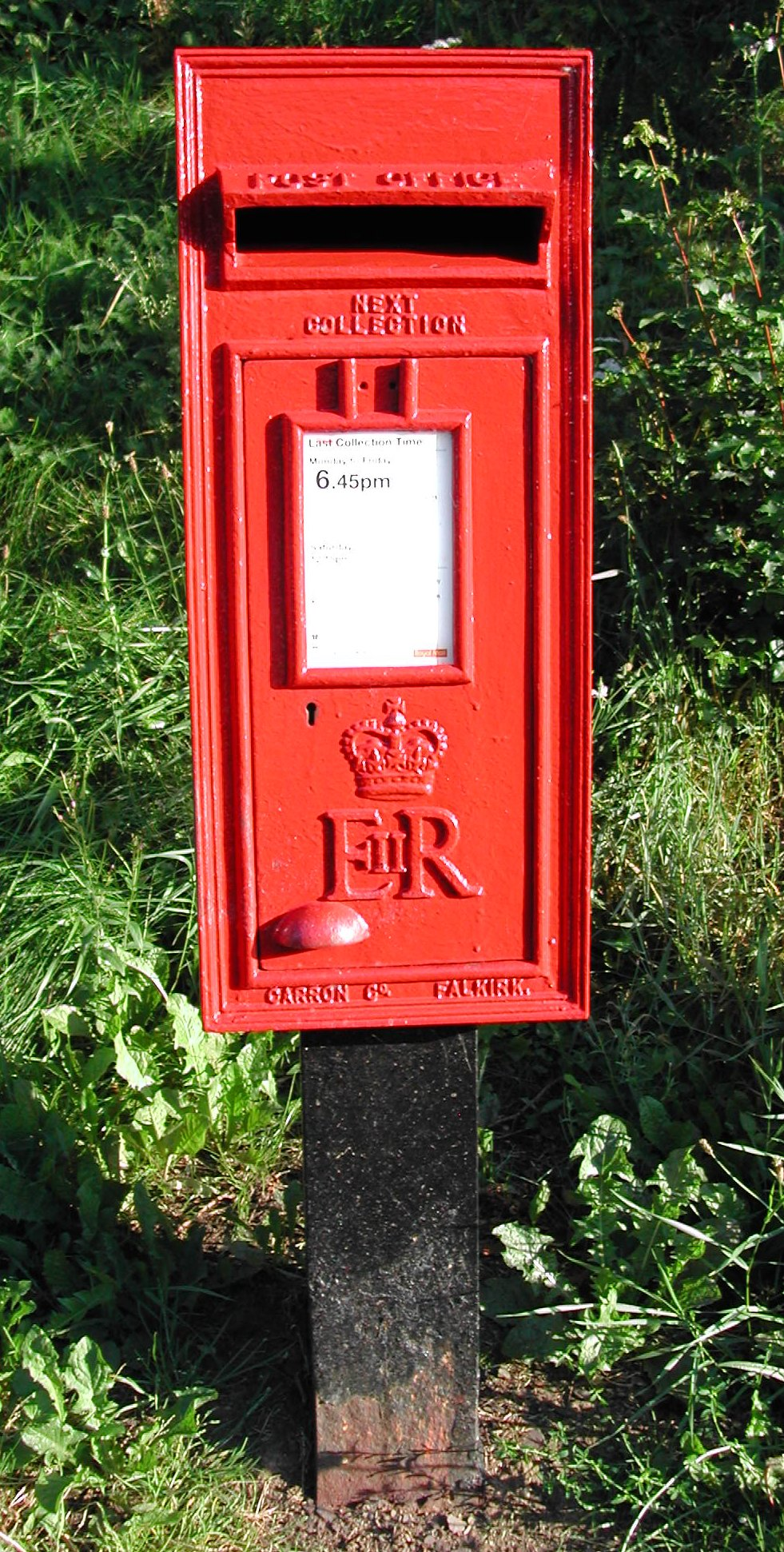
An interesting version of the EIIR wall box in use as a pillar at Cowley Bridge, Exeter. It is a Carron Co. box with full-width 10" aperture

Coming to the throne in 1952, Queen Elizabeth II has had the longest reign of any British monarch since the invention of the post box. (Queen Victoria reigned for nearly as long, but post boxes only appeared halfway through her reign.) Hence there are more EIIR boxes on the streets of the UK and Commonwealth countries than of any other monarch. Wall box manufacture at the time of her accession was with W.T. Allen & Co. Ltd.

The greatest changes were in the size of the apertures in use. The older six inches (15 cm) wide aperture was not sufficient for modern larger letters and was quickly enlarged – first to eight inches (20 cm) and then to ten inches (25 cm). This, combined with a change in contractor to Carron Co., led to a good variety of boxes in both Type B and the larger Type A. The contract for manufacturing cast-iron wall boxes ceased in 1980, but in the period 1952-1980 more than 20,000 boxes were installed in the UK.

In Scotland there were protests when the boxes made early in the reign of Elizabeth II were produced. These bore the cypher "EIIR" but there were objections because Queen Elizabeth is the first Queen of Scotland and Queen of the United Kingdom to bear that name; Elizabeth I having been Queen of England and Queen of Ireland only. After several EIIR pillar boxes were blown up by improvised explosive devices, the General Post Office (as it was at that time) replaced them with ones which only bore the Crown of Scotland and no royal cypher. Red telephone boxes or kiosks of type K6 were also treated in the same way, so too GPO/Royal Mail lamp and Pillar boxes.

=== Republic of Ireland ===
There are many true British boxes still extant in the Republic of Ireland from the reigns of Victoria, Edward VII and George V. However, locally made boxes from the foundry of H. & C. Smith in Dublin were commissioned very early in the history of wall boxes. Indeed, a First National Standard box of this type can be seen at Johnstownbridge, County Kildare. Additionally, H. & C. Smith were asked to provide local versions of the WB78 Smith and Hawkes wall box during 1861 and one can still be seen at Kilmacoon Hill in Dublin.

Following the 1922 Partition of Ireland, the Irish Free State continued to commission foundries to make boxes of similar design to those installed under British rule, but without a royal cipher and repainted the red boxes in green. Many of these were from the foundry of IVI at Athy, County Kildare, who held the contract for several decades. Earlier Irish Free State boxes, such as the large A size box seen below, have the elaborate wreathed harp emblem on the door. However, with the formation of the Irish Government Department of Posts and Telegraphs, their Gaelic script logo "P&T" (using a Tironian "et" instead of ampersand) began to appear on wall boxes, such as that seen below at Clonmany, County Donegal. In recent times the department has become a free-standing commercial organisation known as An Post. No cast iron wall boxes have been made with An Post's wavy line logo, but there are plenty of sheet steel wall boxes across the Republic bearing adhesive decals or screen printed with An Post's distinctive yellow on green logo.

== Images ==
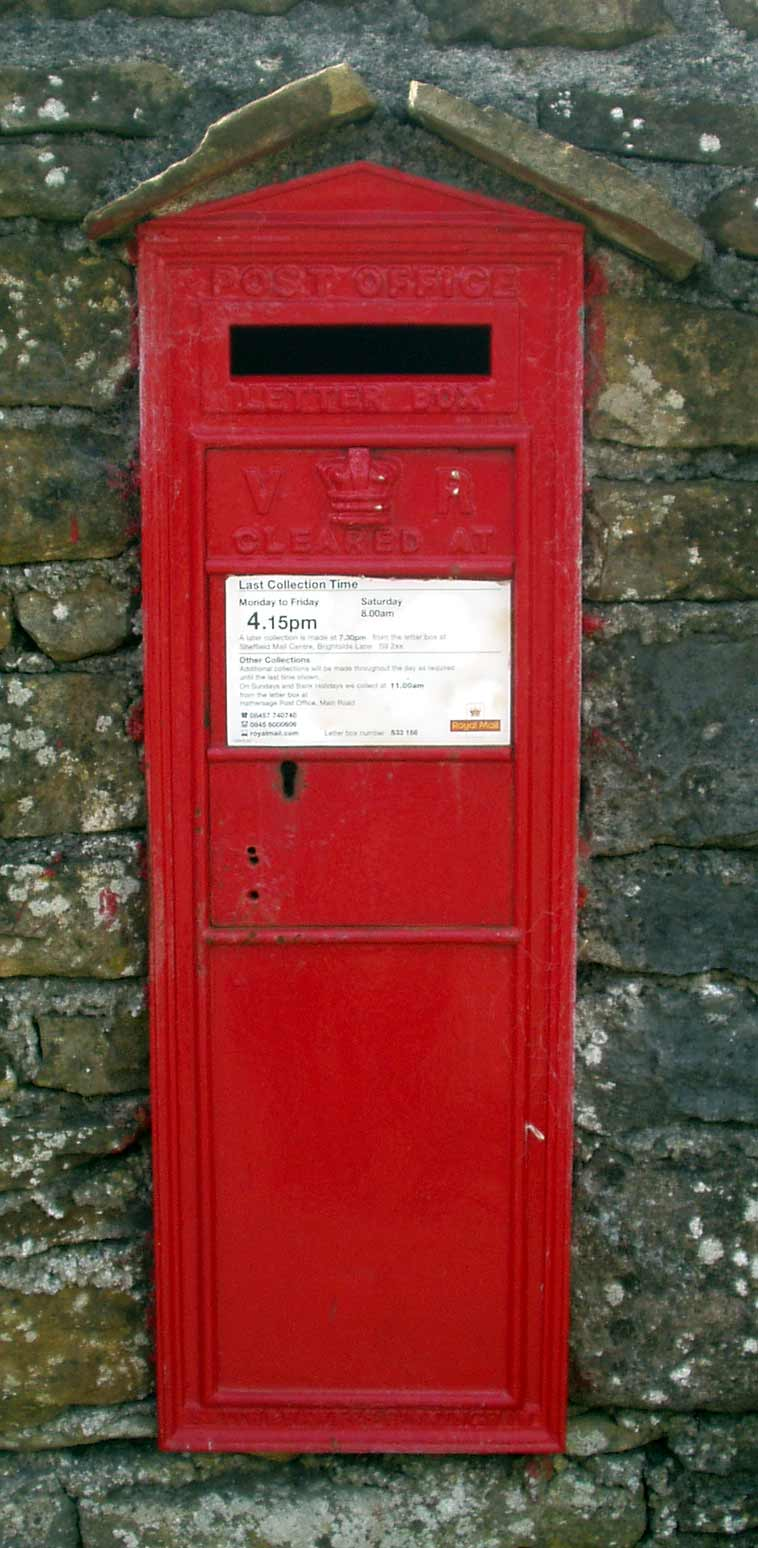
WB75: Victorian 1st National Standard wall box in Brough, Derbyshire, England.

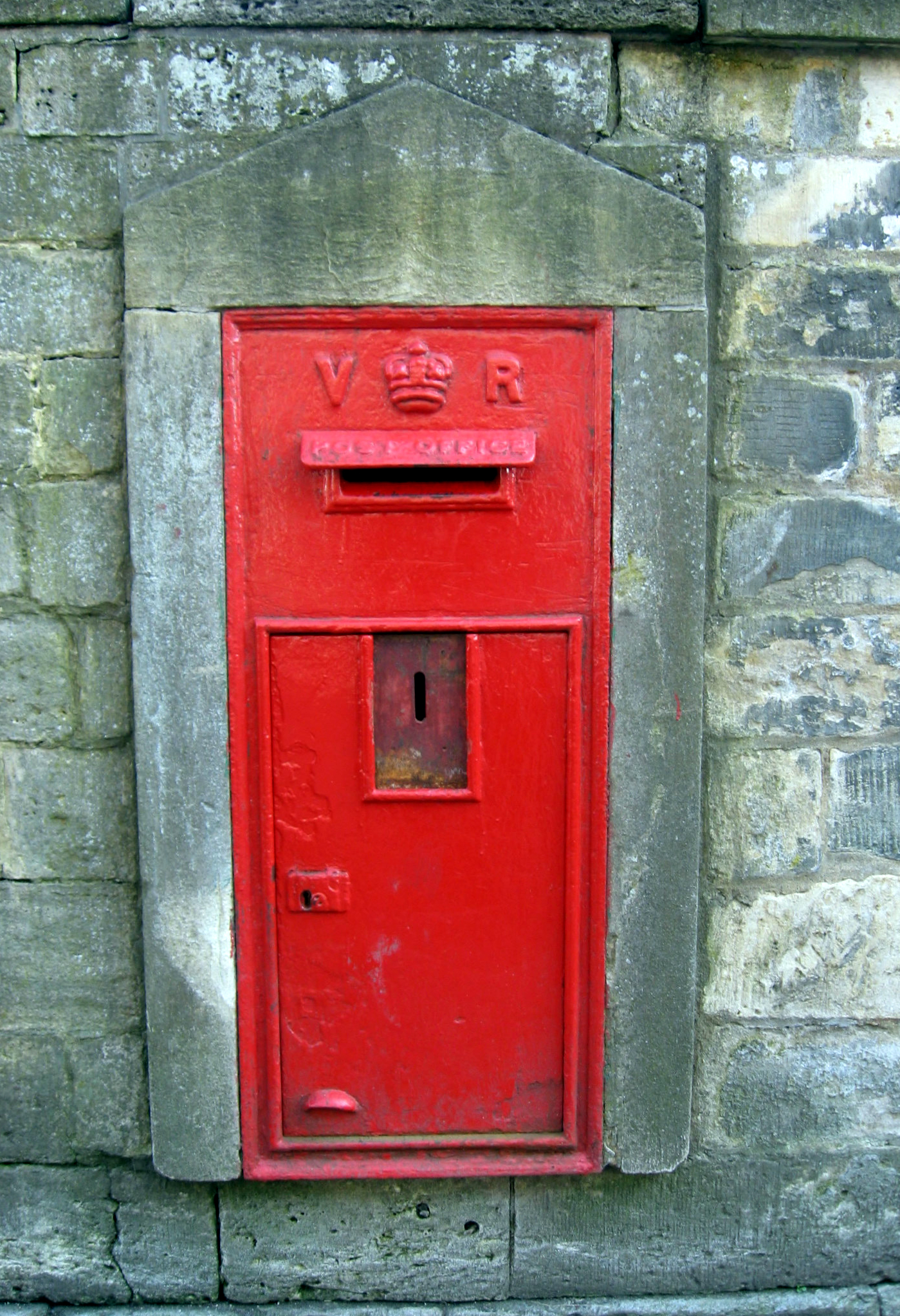
1880s Victorian wall box at Stroud, Gloucestershire.

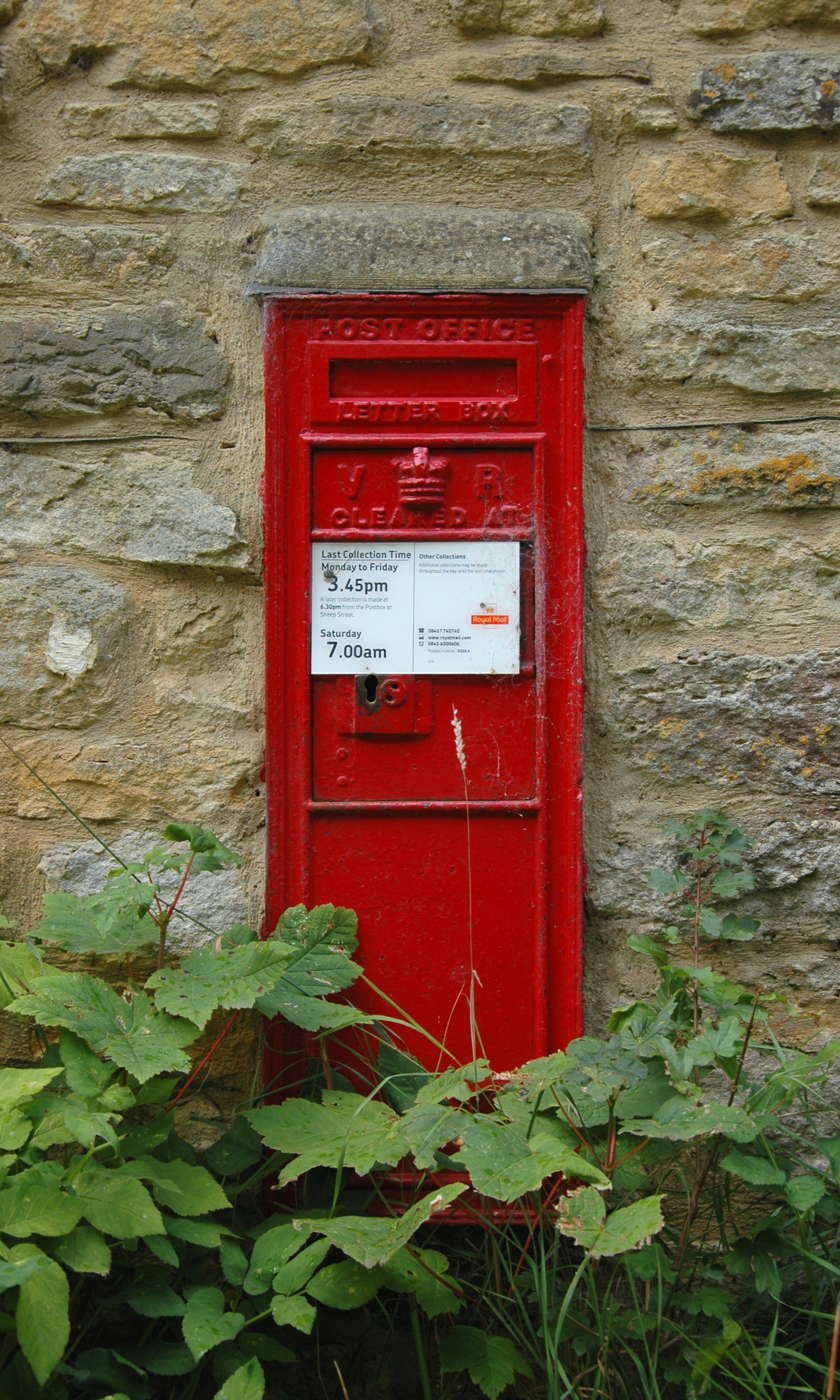
Victorian wall box at Steeple Barton, Oxfordshire.

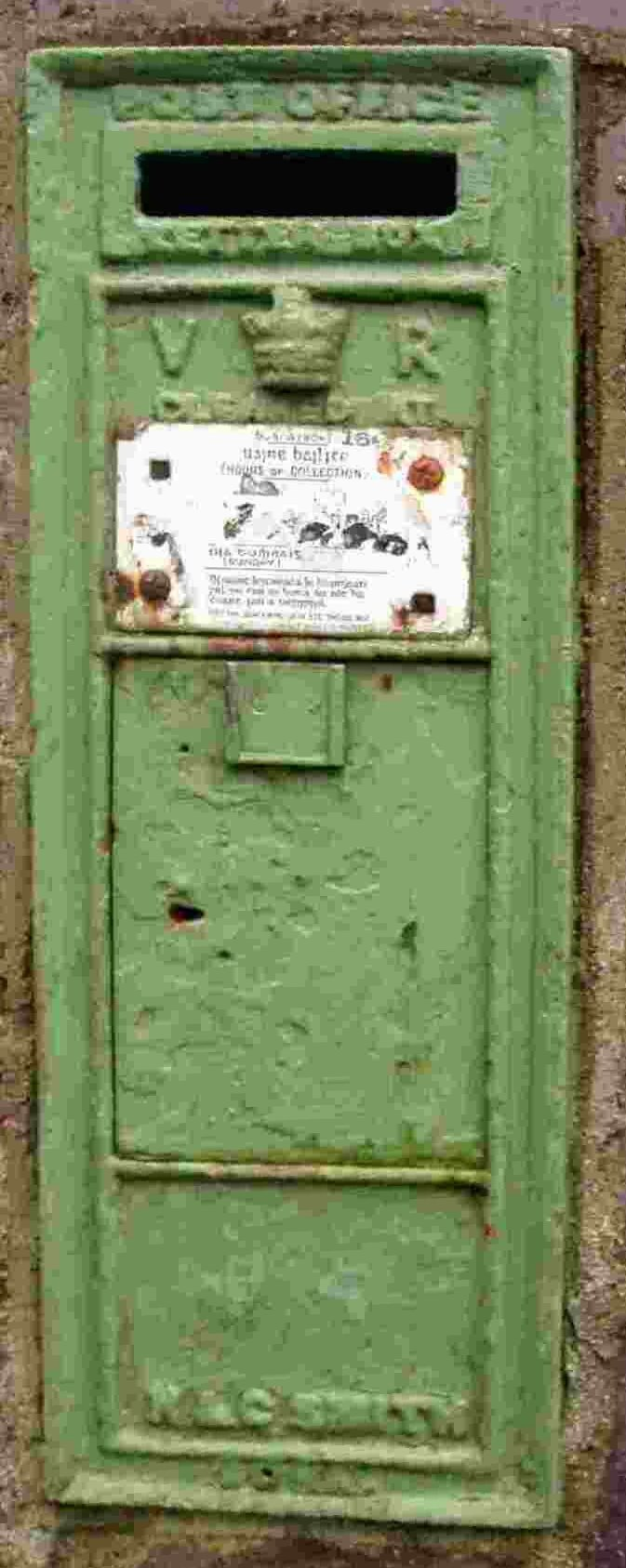
One of the oldest wall boxes in Ireland is the locally made WB74 at Johnstownbridge, made by H.& C. Smith of Dublin.

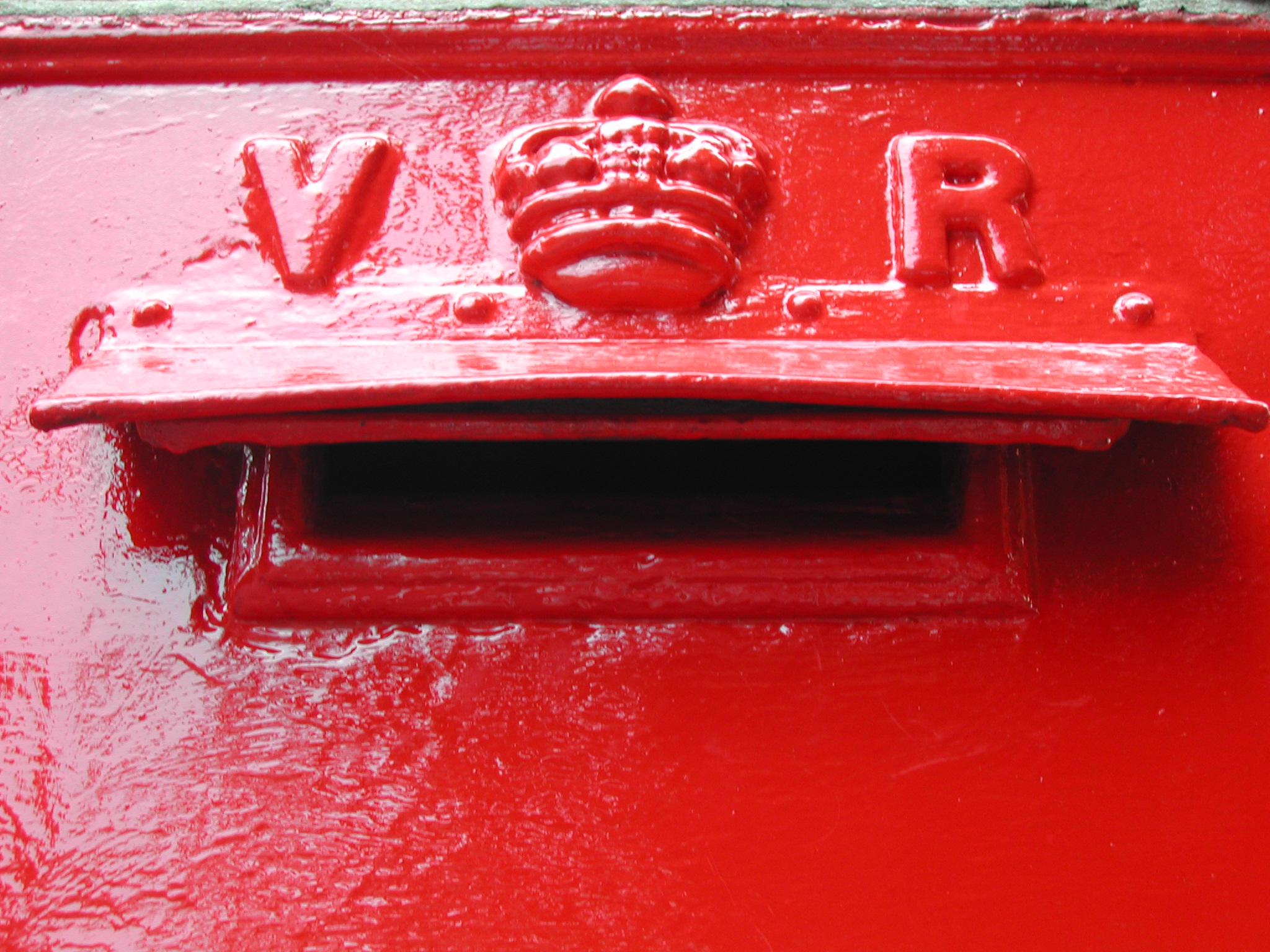
WB84 Unusual modified aperture on a Victorian A size wall box inside Chatham Royal Navy Dockyard Kent.

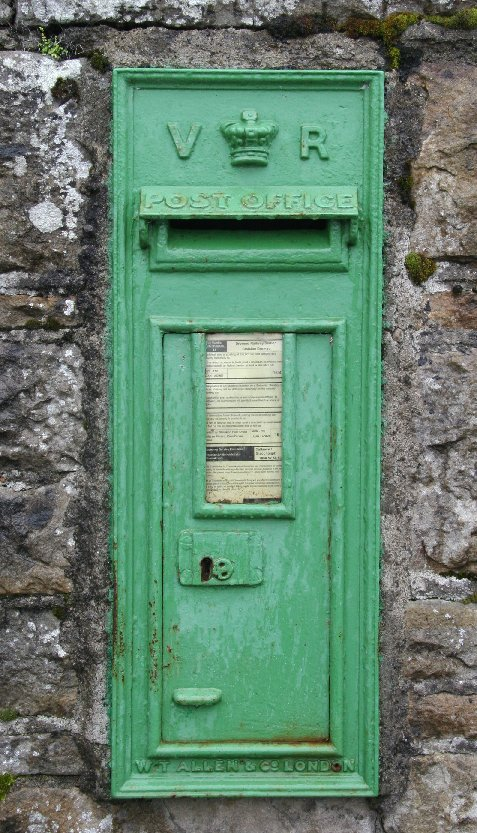
WB87/2 Victorian Type C wall box still in use with An Post at Dromod railway station, County Leitrim, Ireland.

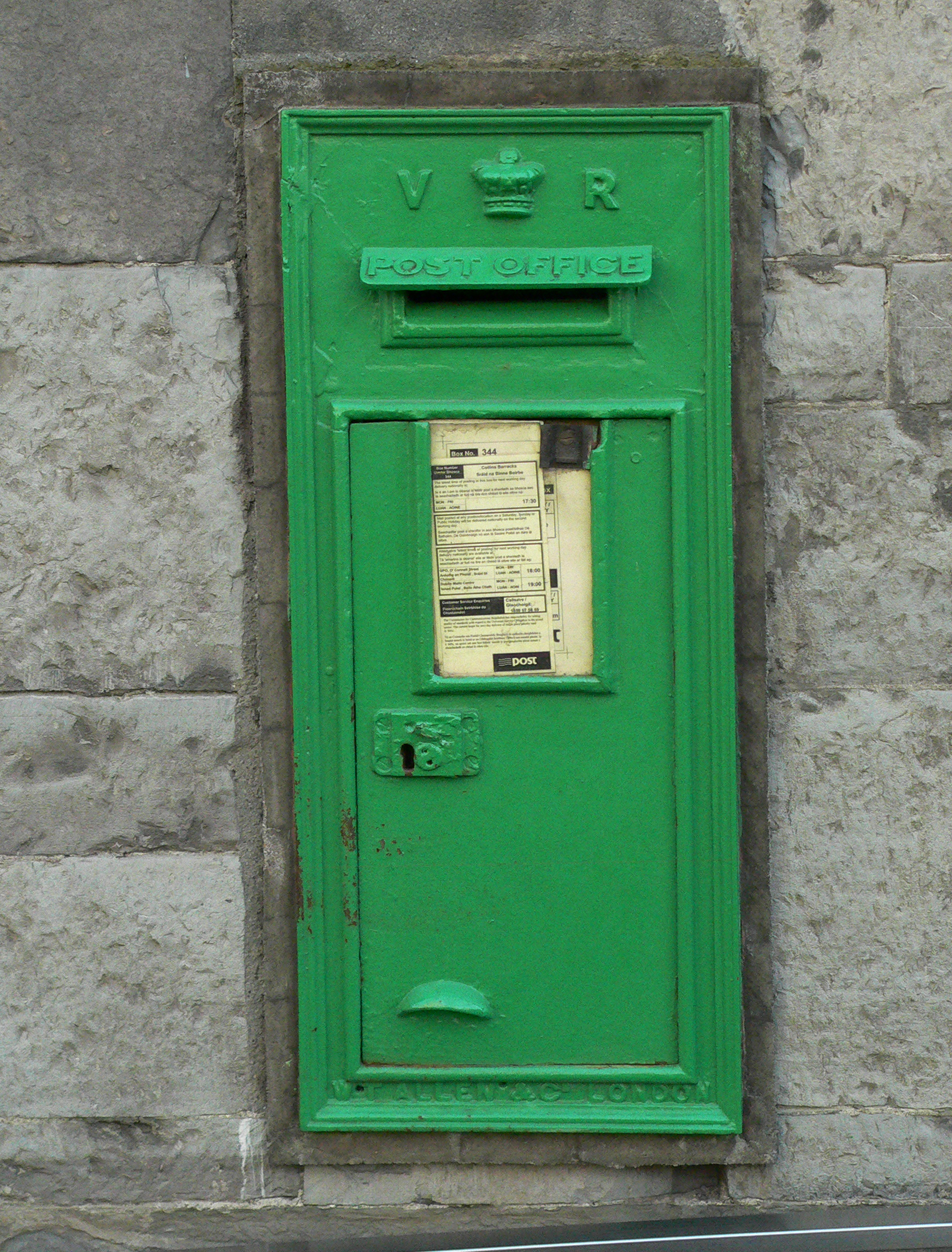
An An Post VR wall box at the National Museum of Ireland, Dublin, Ireland.

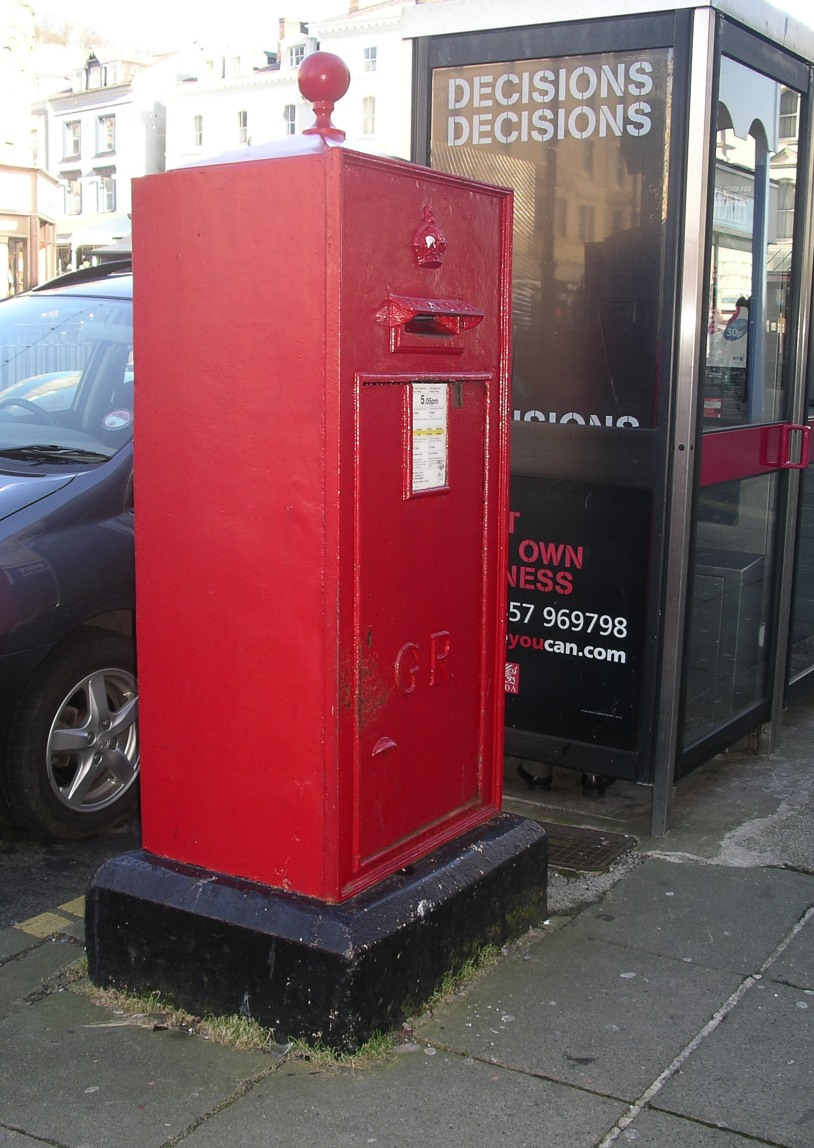
WB95 Large free-standing GR wall box in Gloddaeth Street, Llandudno, Wales.

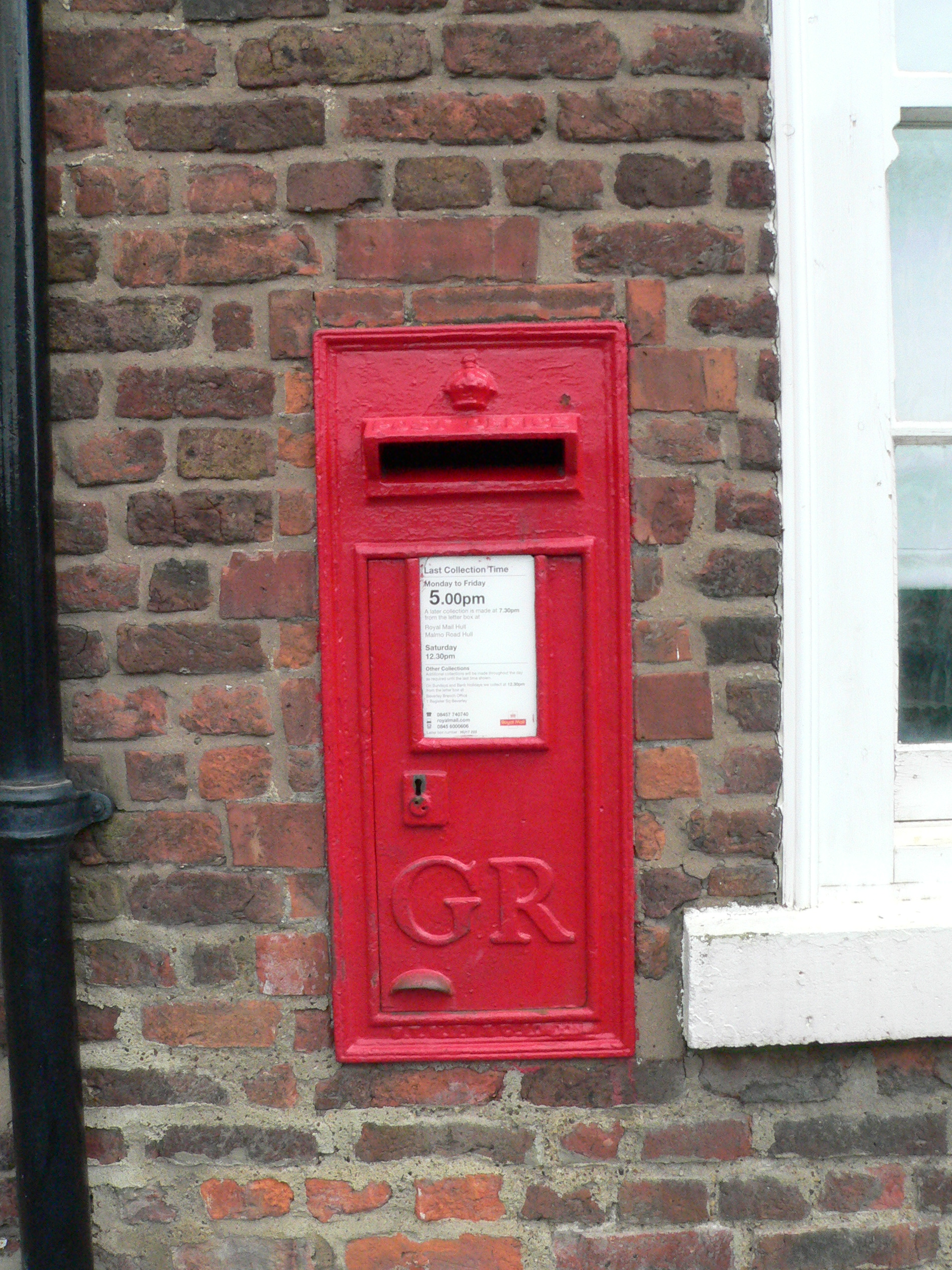
GR wall box at Beverley railway station.

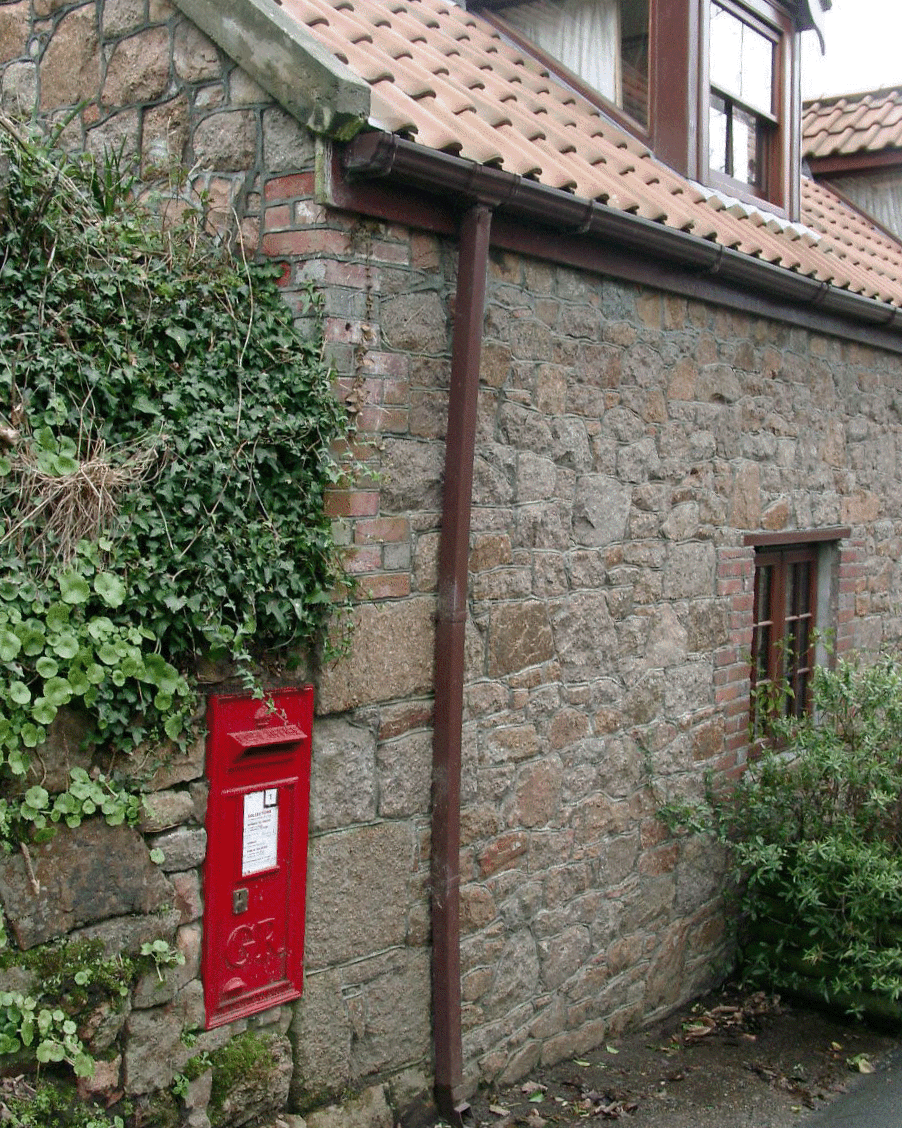
WB106 GR Type B wall box in Saint Brelade, Jersey.

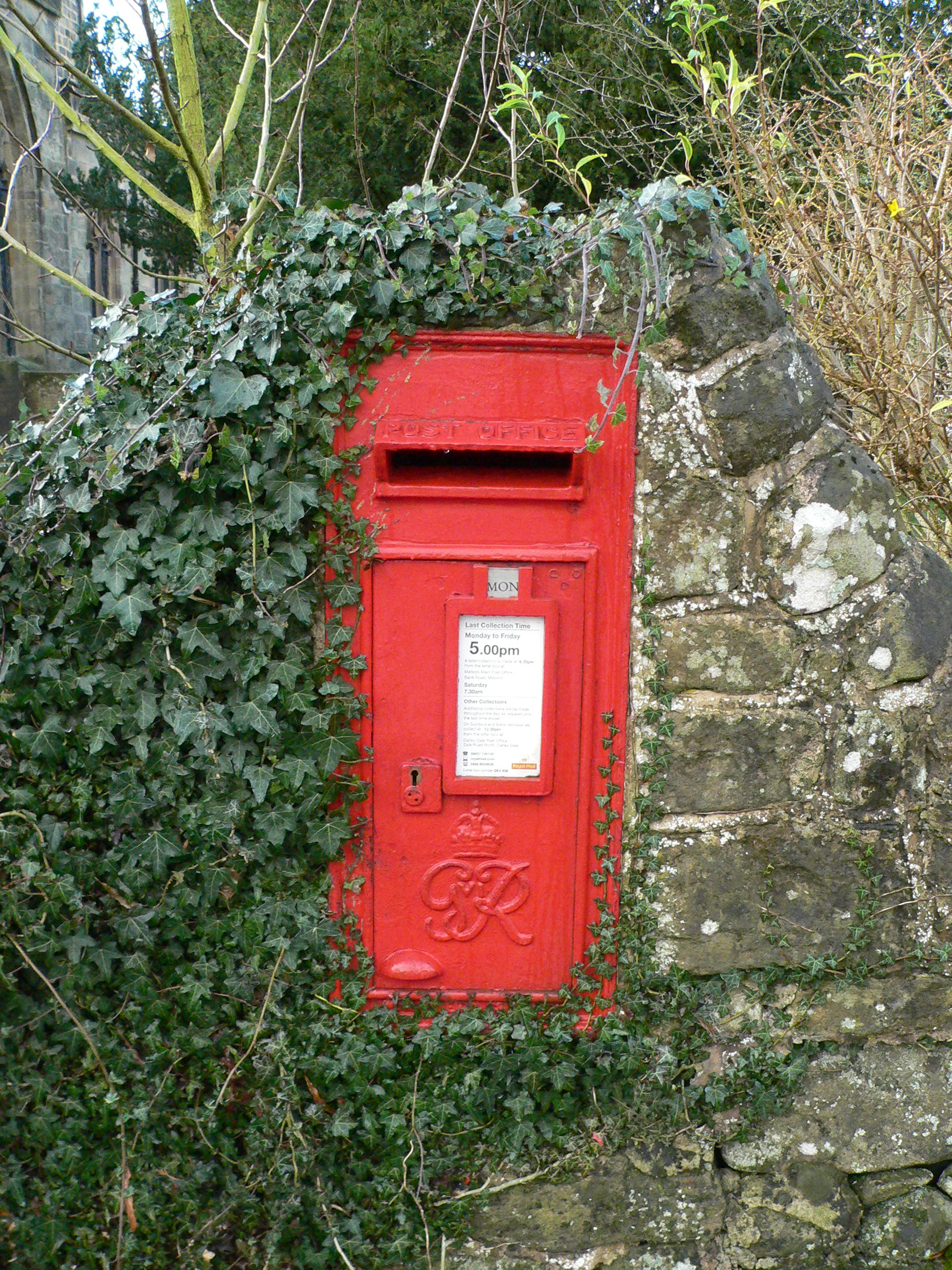
GVIR wall box in a rural location near Darley Dale church, Derbyshire, England.

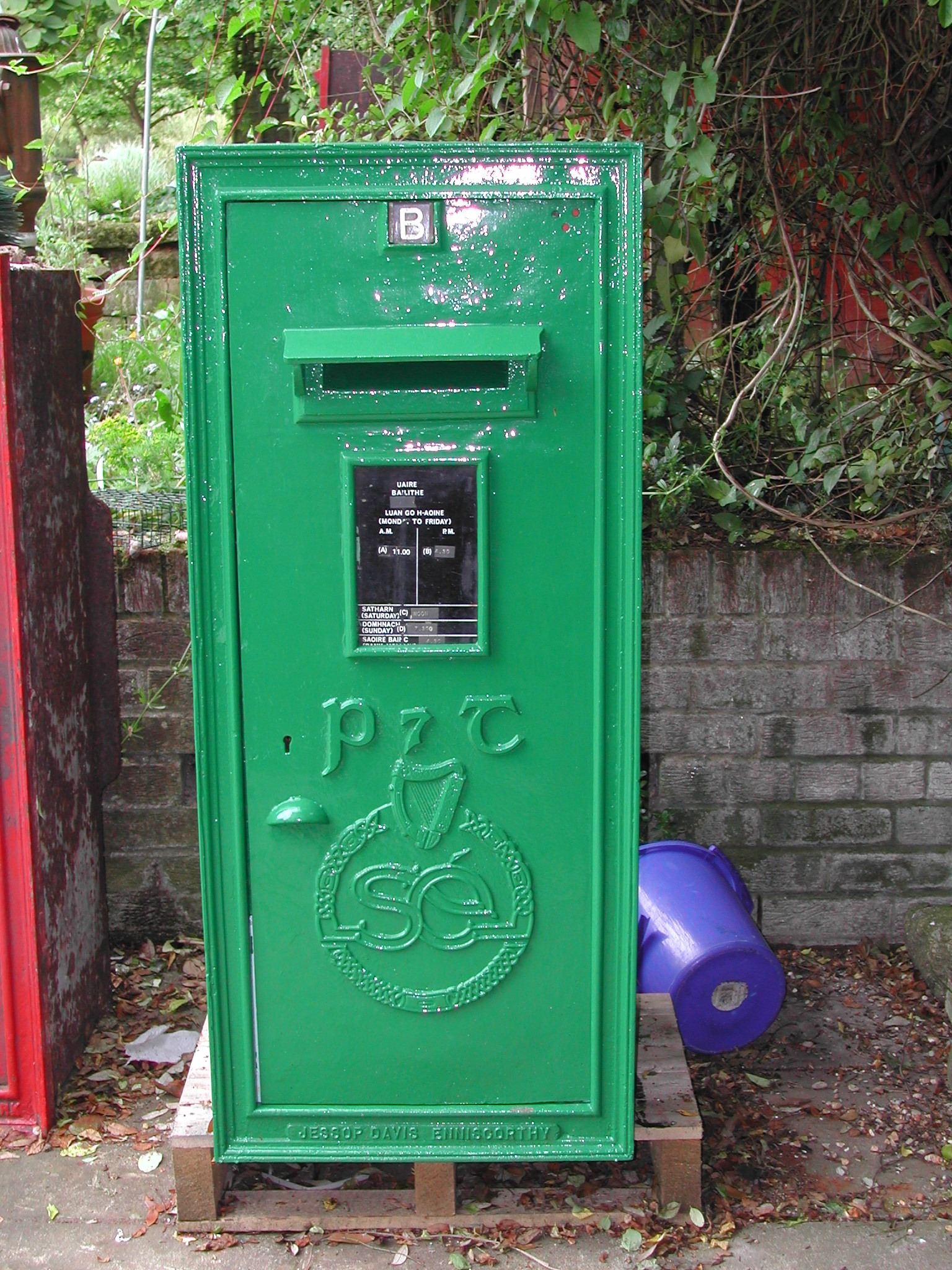
Irish Free State Type A wall box at the Isle of Wight Postal Museum.

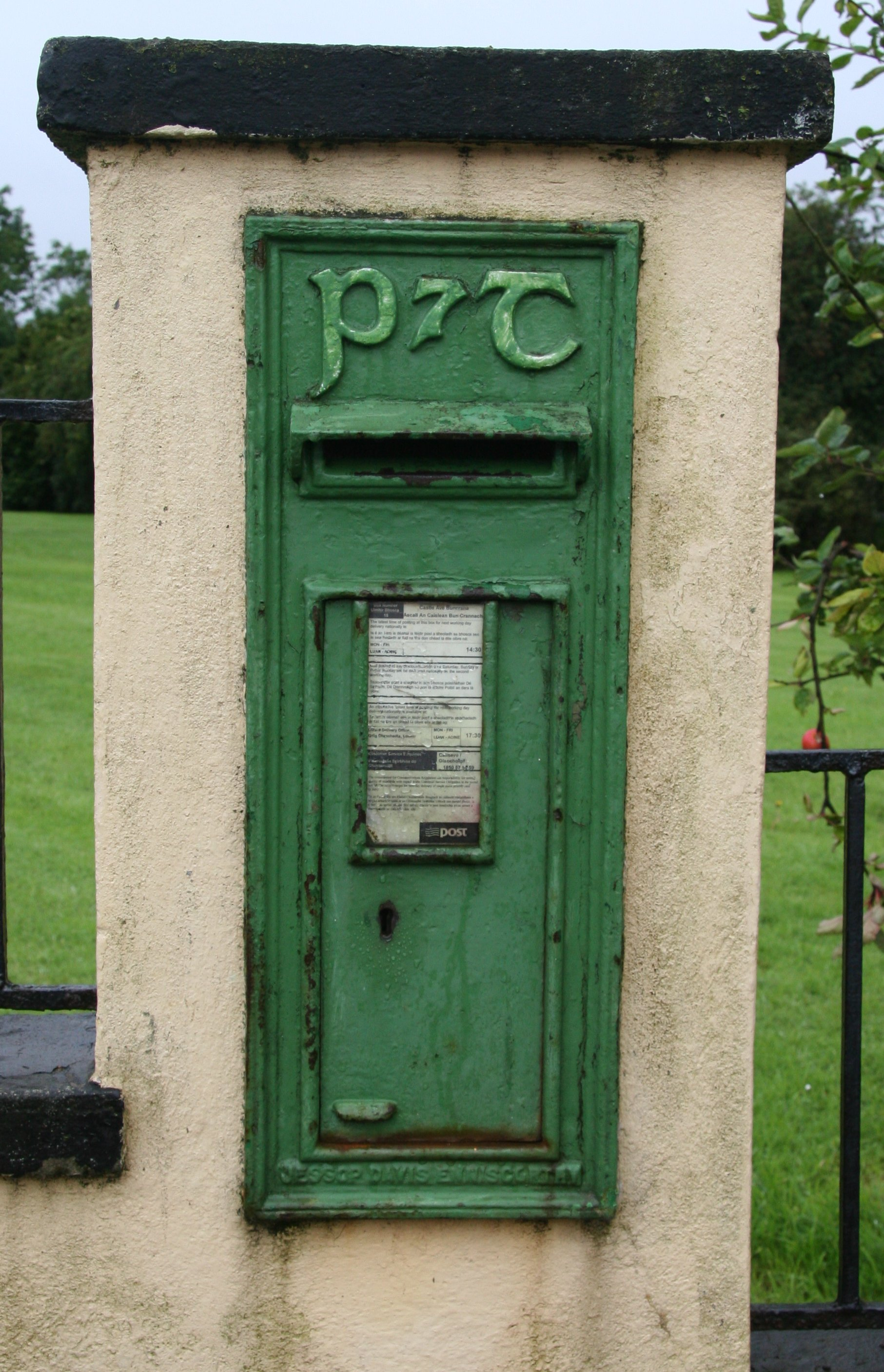
Buncrana, County Donegal, High Street is the location of this C size P7T wall box.

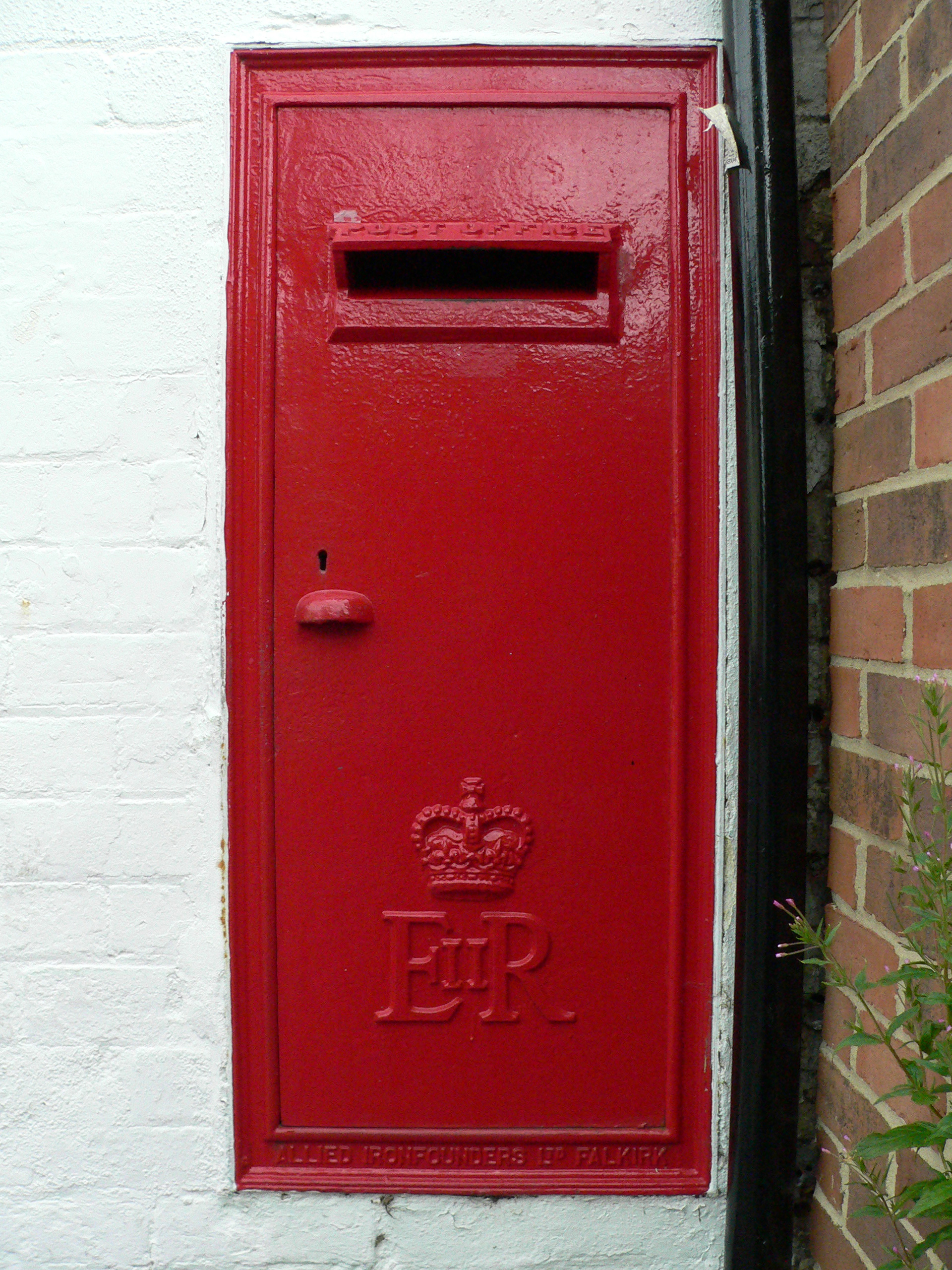
Large EIIR Type 'D' wall box at Alrewas PO, Staffordshire, England.

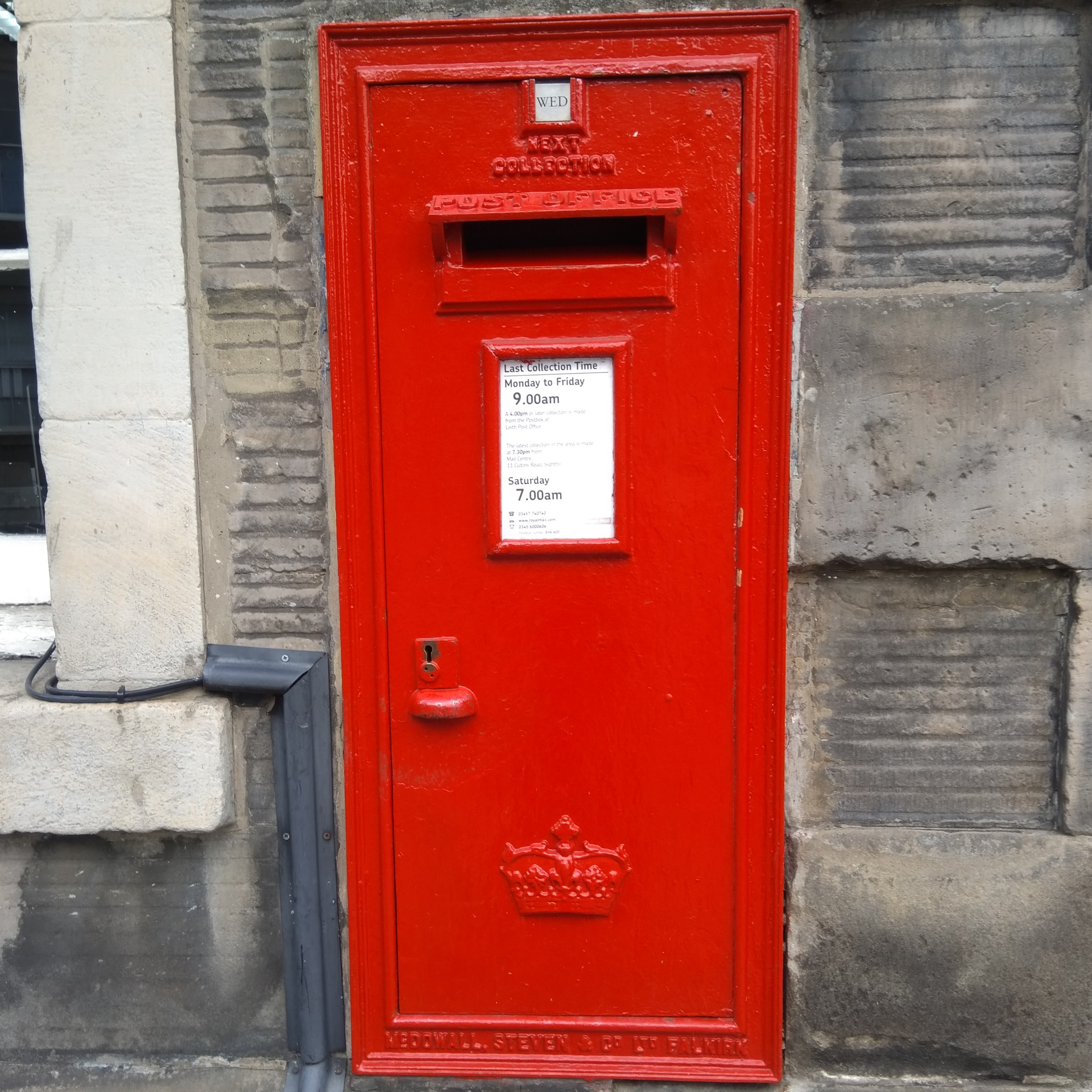
Elizabeth II era design in Edinburgh, showing the Crown of Scotland in place of the St Edward's Crown/EIIR cypher used outside Scotland.

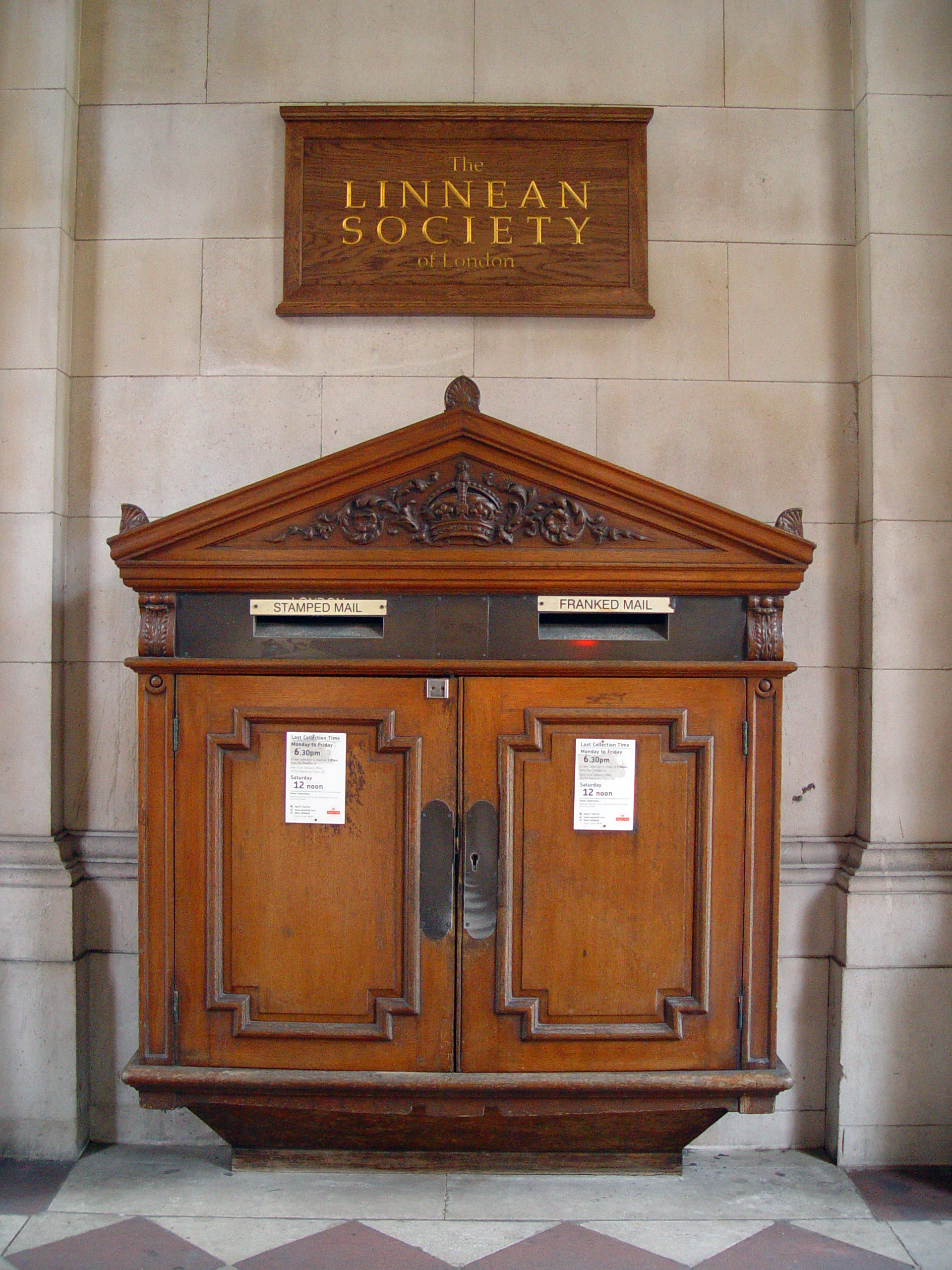
A wooden wall box in Burlington House, London.

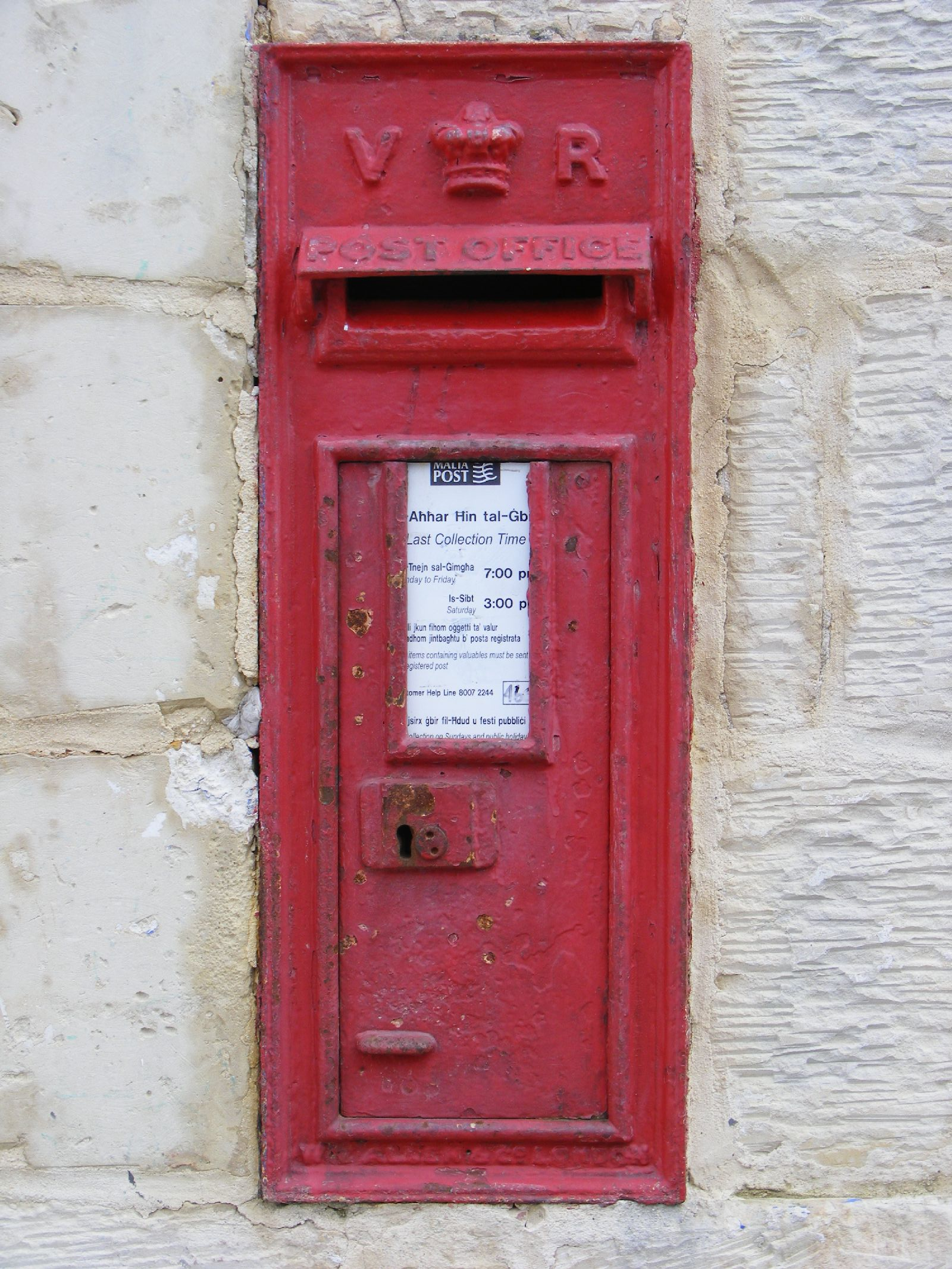
Victorian wall box in Rabat, Malta

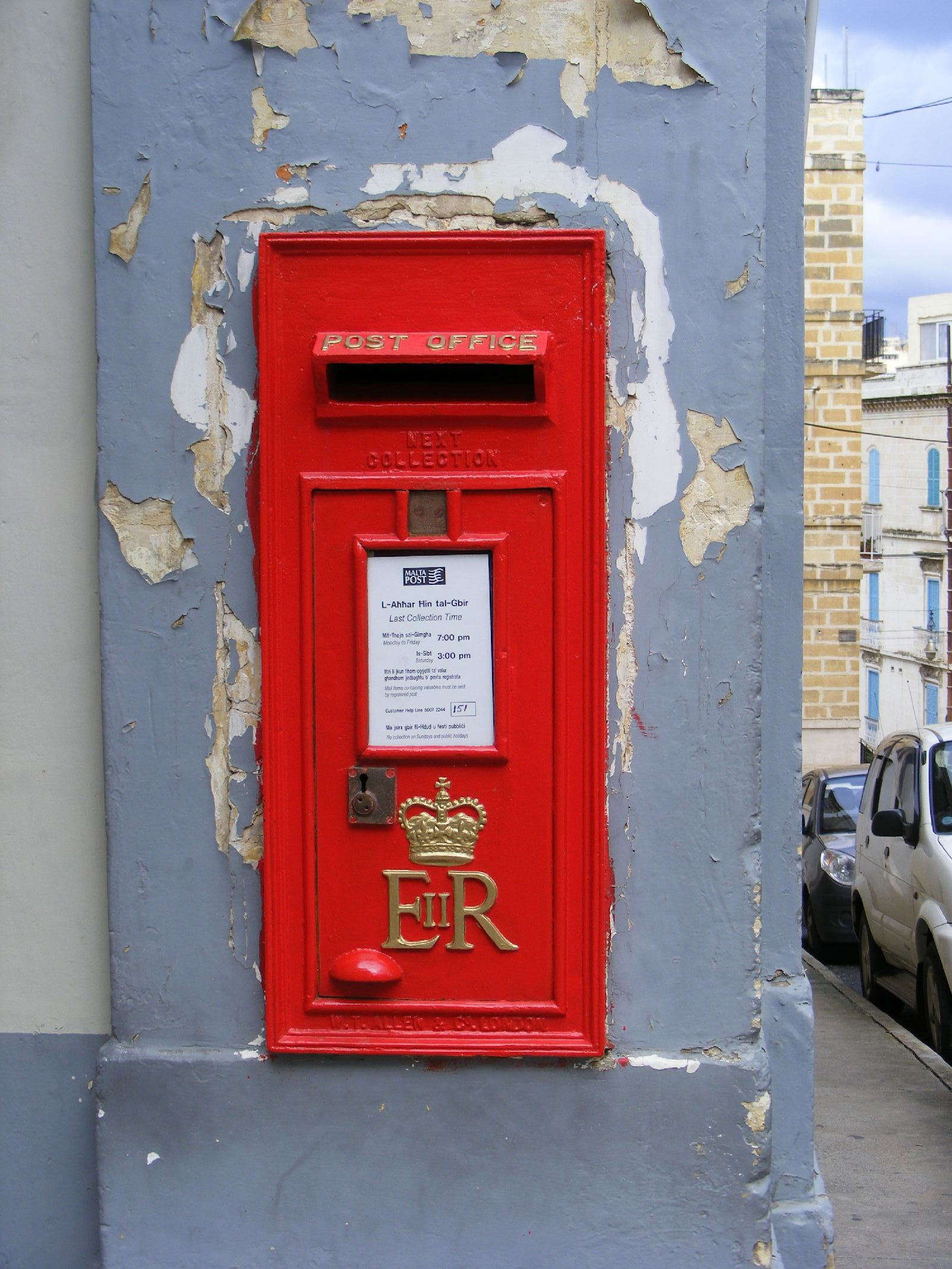
Queen Elizabeth II wall box in Senglea, Malta

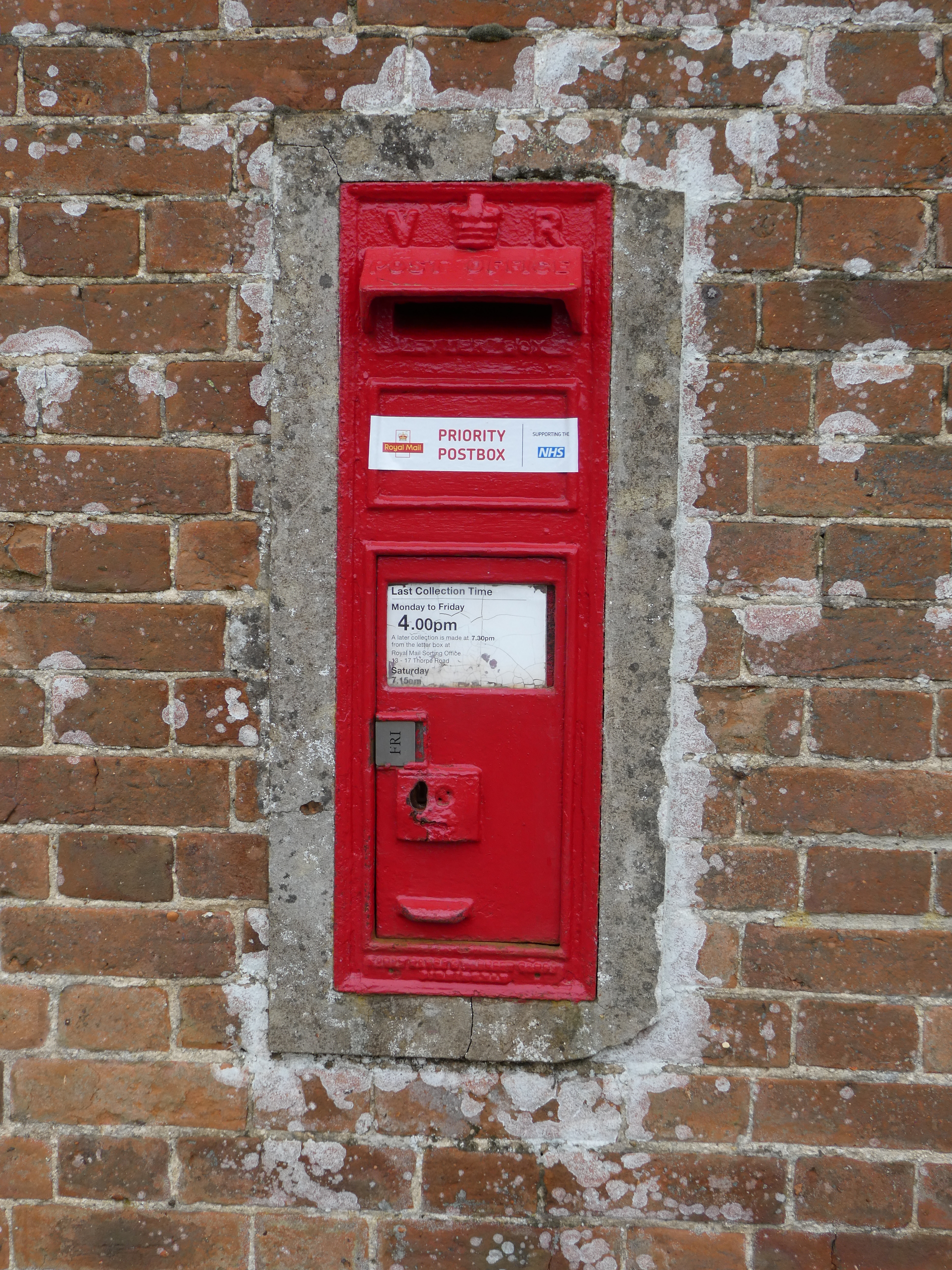
A Royal Mail wall box in Salle, Norfolk

== Wall boxes around the world ==
The wall box has proved to be a very resilient design. It has been widely adopted by French postal authorities with a succession of finely detailed and often ornate boxes in France and its dependent territories.

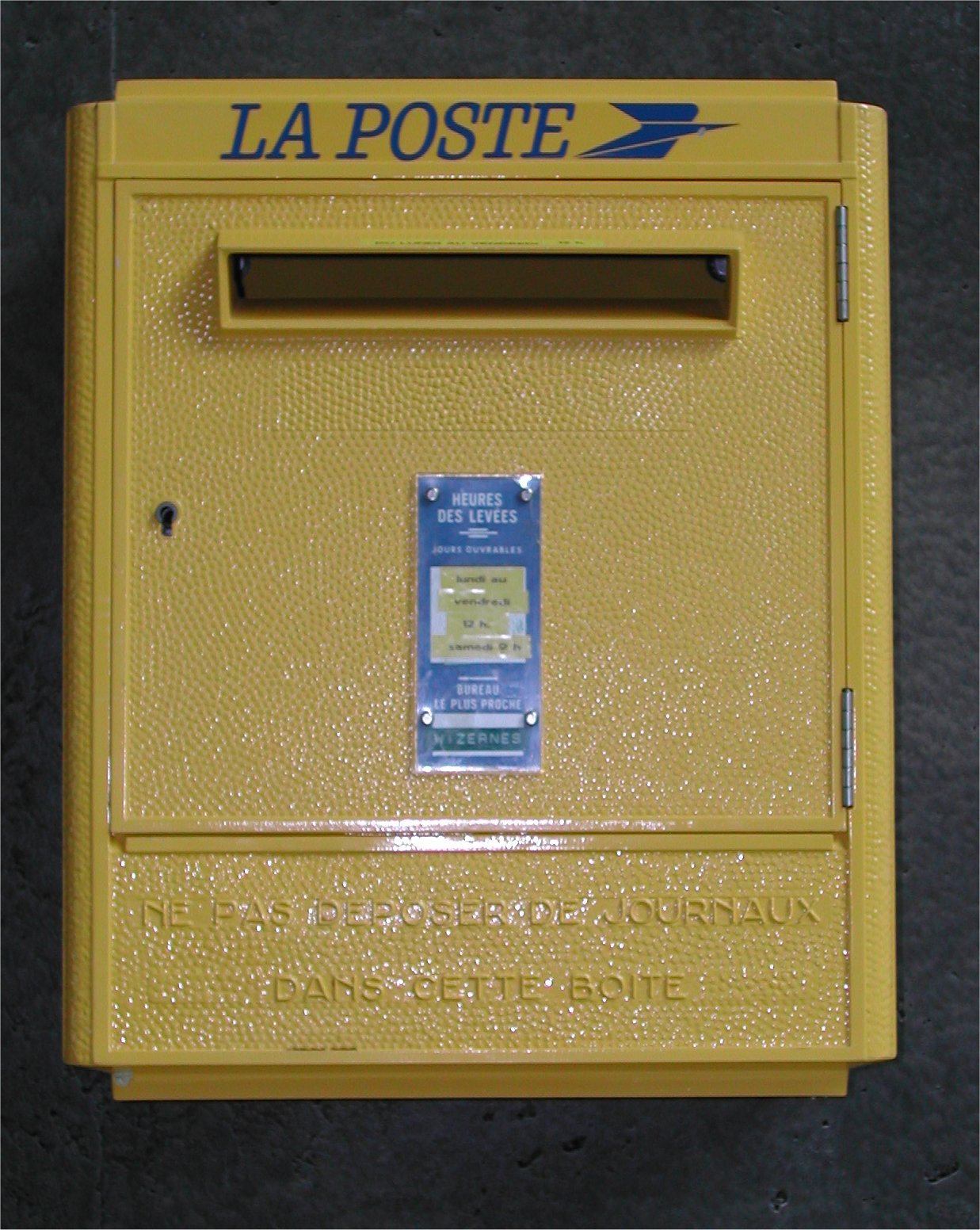
1985 pattern large wall box at Les Mesnils Garnier, Normandy

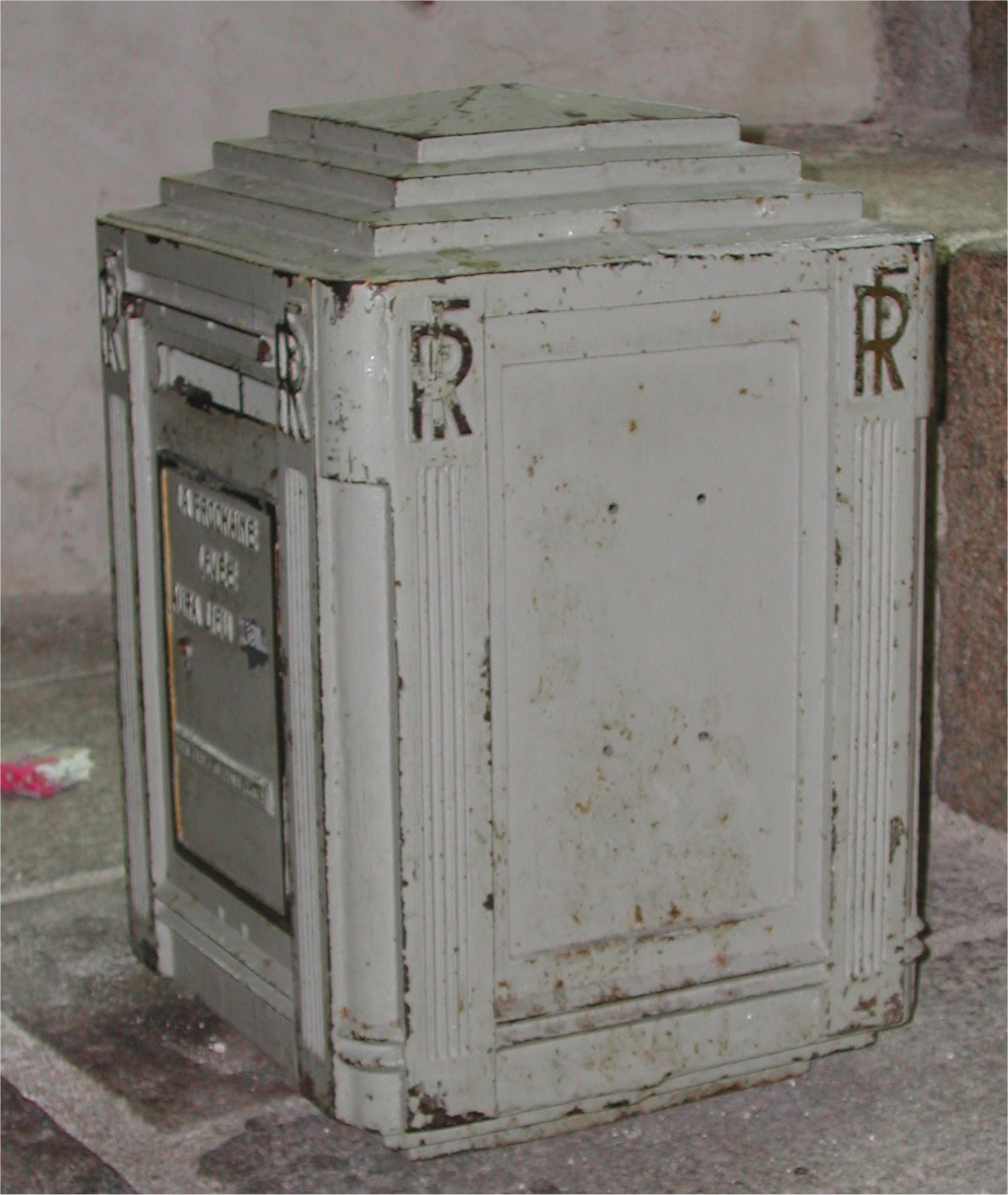
1944 Pattern wall box inside Mont Saint-Michel, Brittany

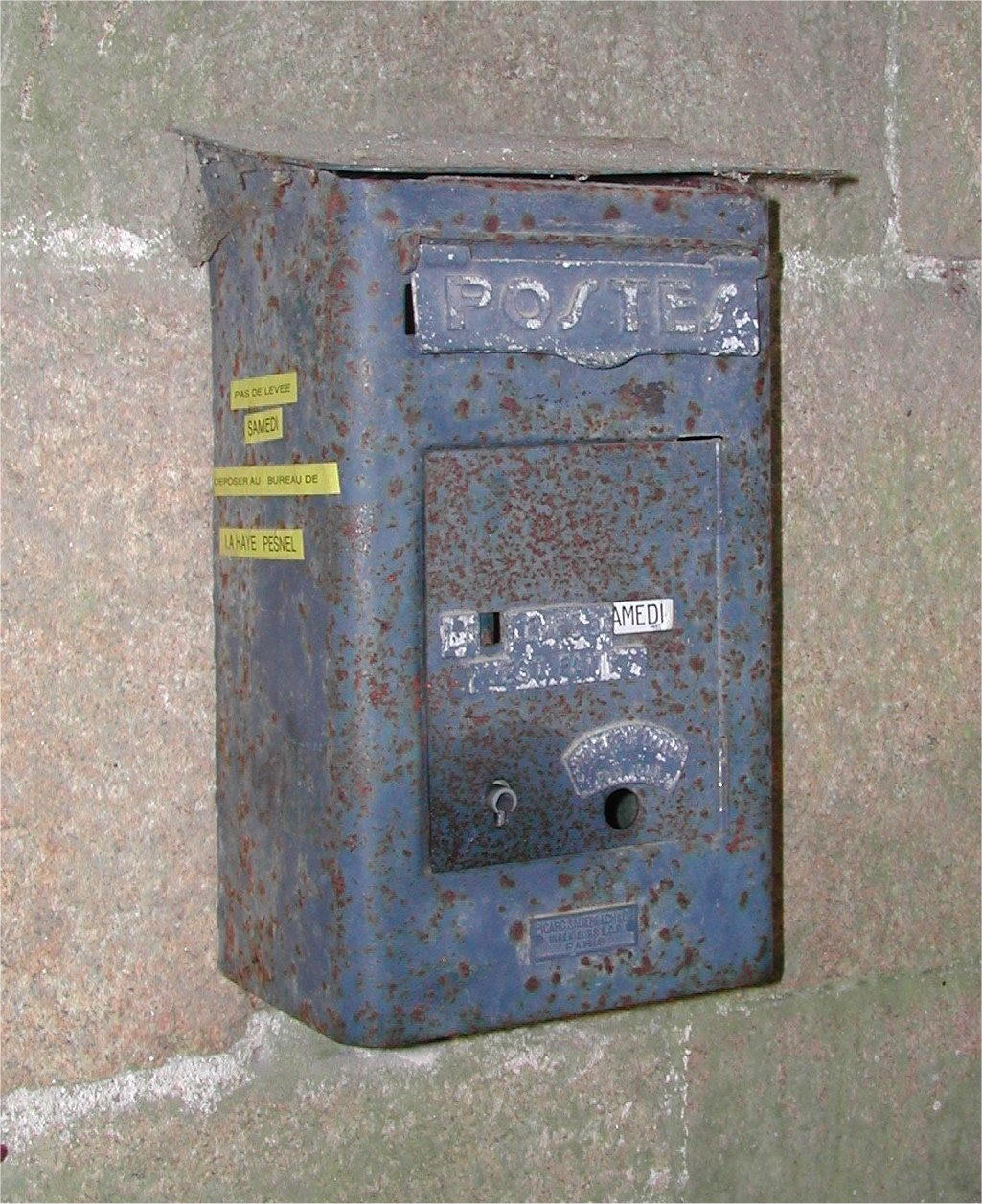
1930 sheet steel box at L'Abbée de La Lucerne, near Granville, Normandy

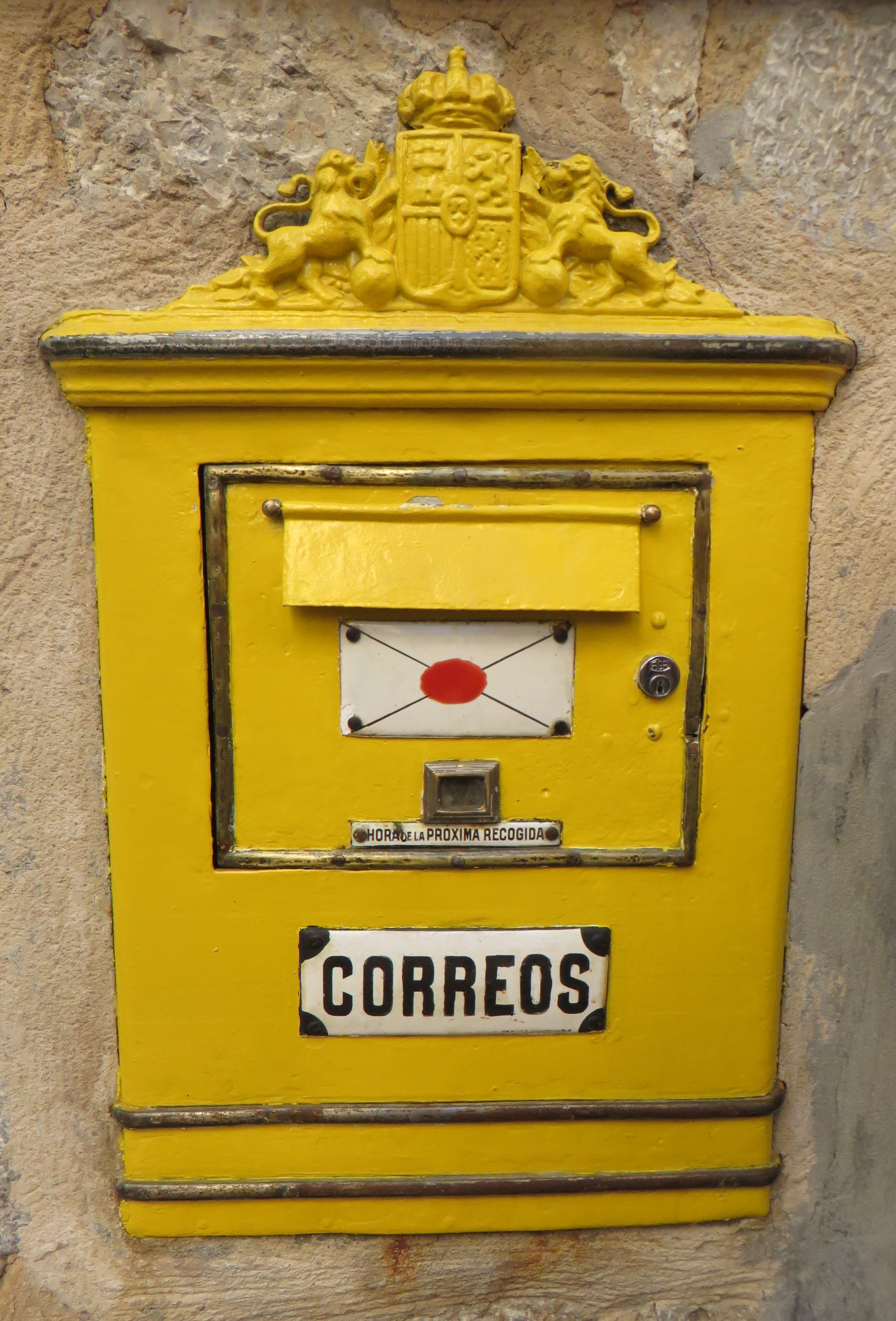
Old wall box in Mallorca (Spain)

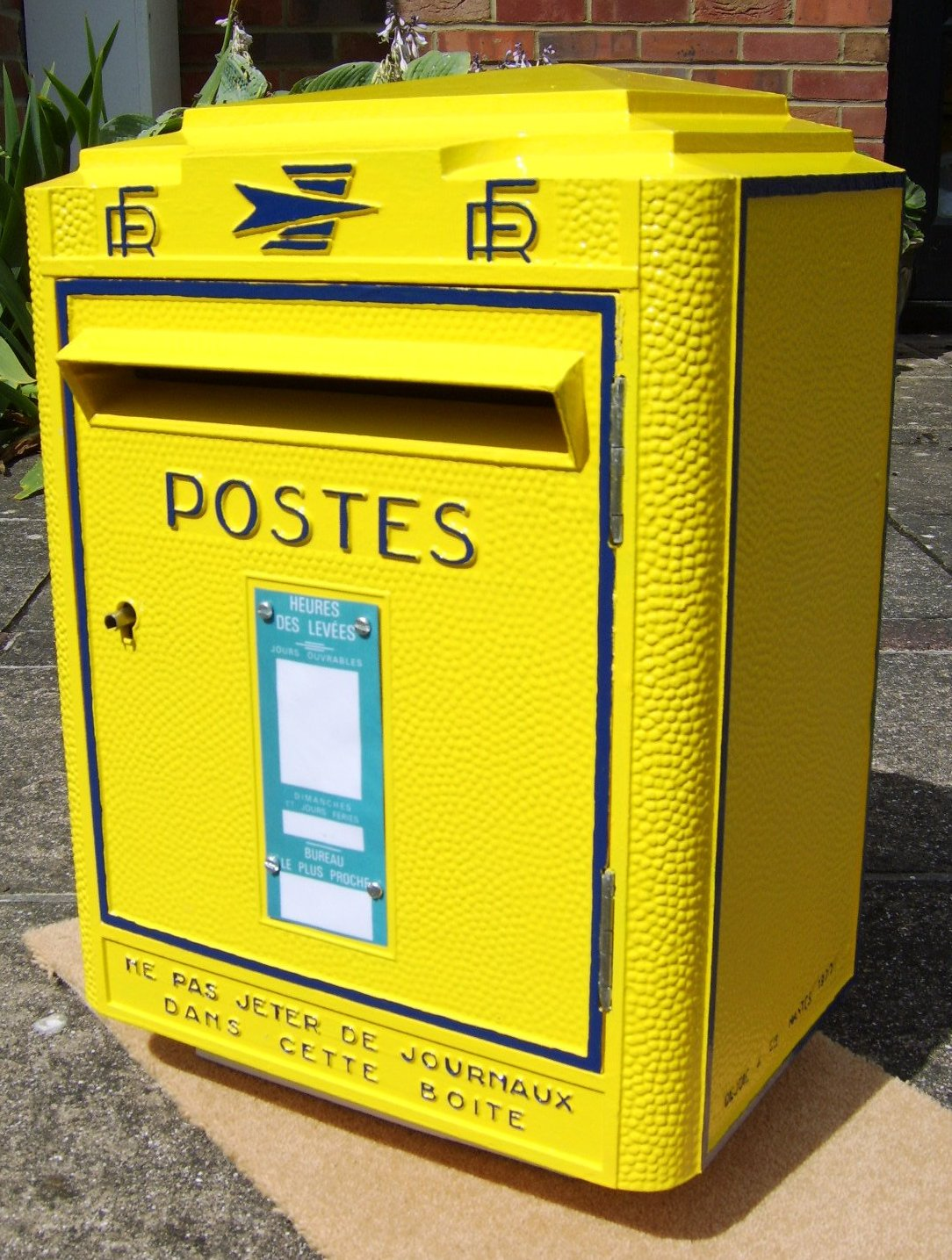
French wall box of the 1977 pattern now on display at the Colne Valley Postal History Museum, Essex.

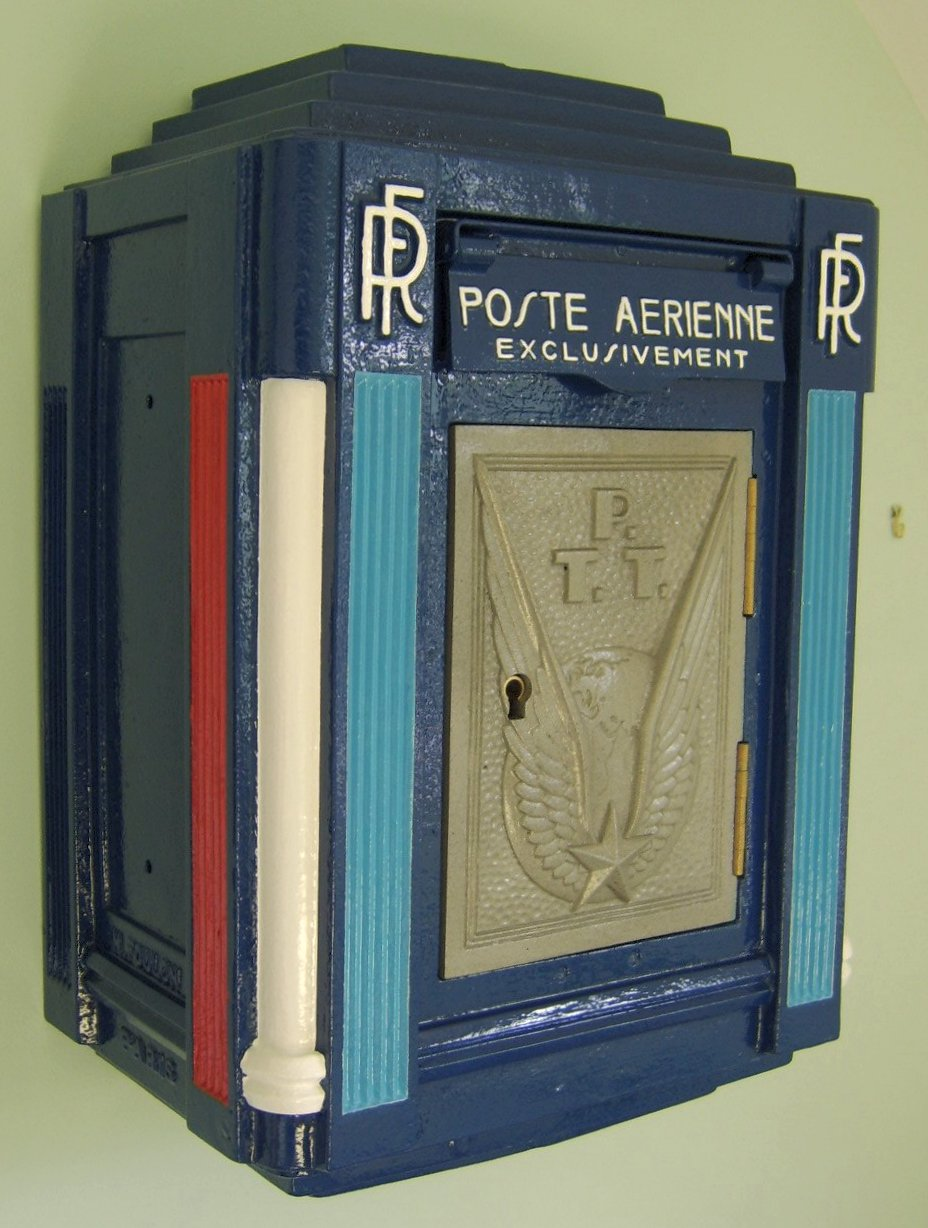
French Aerial Post box from the 1930s, now in a UK private collection.

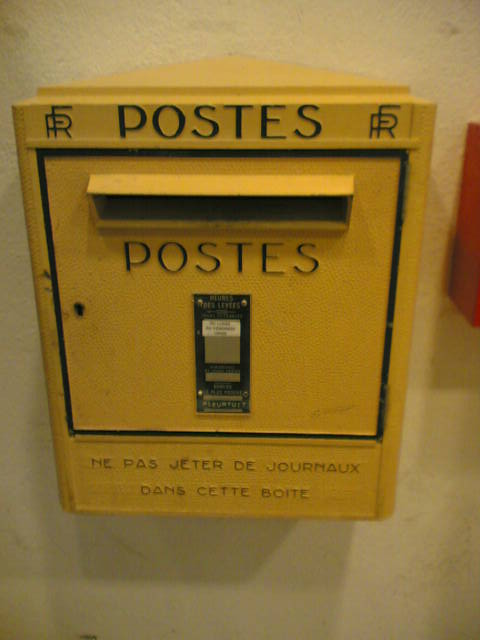
French Post Box at Dinard airport

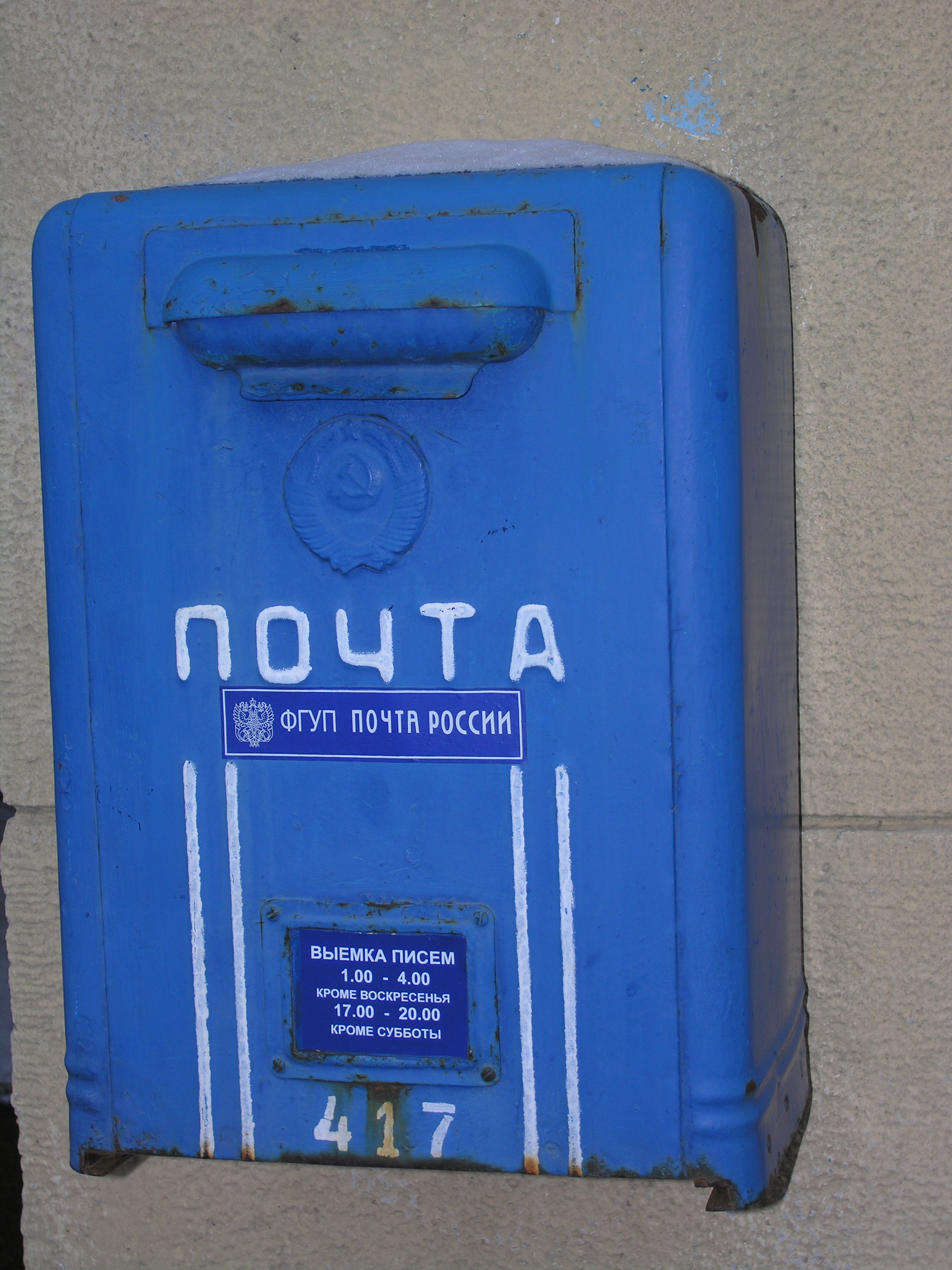
The standard post box of the former Soviet Union

== See also ==
- Pillar box
- Lamp box
- Ludlow style wall box
- Post box
- 2012 Olympics gold post boxes in the United Kingdom
