= C Both Sides =

Collective art project in Ireland

C Both Sides was a collective art project founded in 2006 by artists Teresa Doyle and Edel O Reilly Flynn in association with Westmeath County Council. They invited people across Ireland to send them postcards for display in Mullingar Arts Centre in 2007. The project later expanded and culminated in a 2009 Dublin exhibition.

== Background ==
Initially, knowledge of the project spread through internet postings and press releases in local papers. Over 500 cards were received and collated. This small exhibition then travelled to New York. The project was intended to create a social document of Ireland at the time.

Following the initial C Both Sides exhibition, An Post decided to sponsor the ongoing project. The launch of "An Post C Both Sides", a 12-month project, took place in November 2007 at the Gallery of Photography, Meeting House Square in Temple Bar. At the launch, Teresa Doyle described the project as Ireland's largest "collaborative art exhibition".

== Activities ==
Each month of the project's operation had a different theme, which guided the participants when creating a postcard. Workshops were held based on the theme of the month. In August 2008, for example, the theme was migration, and a workshop was held in Ilac Centre City Library, with a group of migrants. Also each month, a public figure was invited to make a postcard, which was featured on the website along with a short interview based on the topic of postcards.

With An Post's sponsorship, the project was rolled out nationally, and each household in Ireland received a blank postcard. The participants were encouraged to consider "both sides" of the postcard. In total, over 3,000 submissions were received, of which 250 were chosen by a panel, to be displayed in an exhibition.

== Exhibition ==
The 12-month project culminated in an exhibition in the Dublin Civic Offices, on Wood Quay. Travel writer and broadcaster, Manchán Magan opened the exhibition in March 2009.

The postcards were displayed in pigeon-holes which were fitted with clear Perspex frames mounted on a rotating spindle. This allowed the viewer to see "both sides" of the postcard.
