= An Post =

State-owned provider of universal postal service and related services in Ireland

- Current logo since 14 December 2018
- Type: State-owned designated activity company
- Industry: Postal services, courier
- Predecessor: Department of Posts and Telegraphs (1924–1984)
- Founded: 1 January 1984
- Headquarters: Exo Building, North Wall Quay Lower, Dublin 1
- Area served: Ireland/Worldwide
- Key people: David McRedmond (CEO); Kieran Mulvey (Chairperson)
- Revenue: ▲€€1,020.5 million (2024)
- Operating income: ▲€41.9 million (2019)
- Net income: ▲€143 million (2019)
- Owner: Government of Ireland (100%)
- Number of employees: 11,832 (2019)
- Subsidiaries: Air Business (AddressPal)
- Website: anpost.com

An Post (Irish pronunciation: [ənˠ ˈpˠɔsˠt̪ˠ]; literally 'The Post') is the state-owned provider of postal services in Ireland. An Post provides a "universal postal service" to all parts of the country as a member of the Universal Postal Union. Services provided include letter post, parcel service, deposit accounts, Express Post (an all-Ireland next-day delivery service), and EMS (international express-mail service).

== Background ==
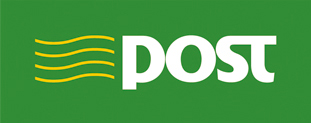
An Post's previous logo used from 1 January 1984 to 13 December 2018

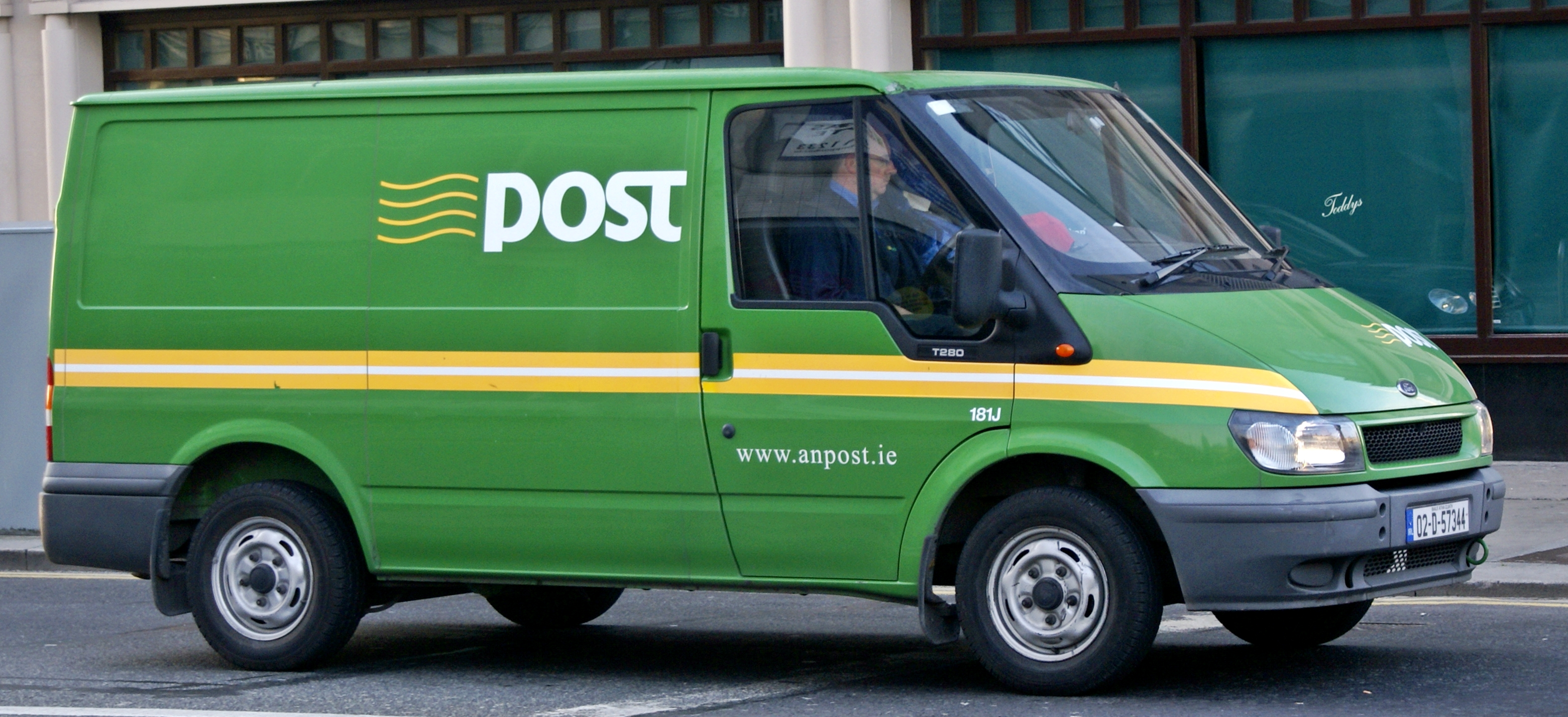
An Post postal van

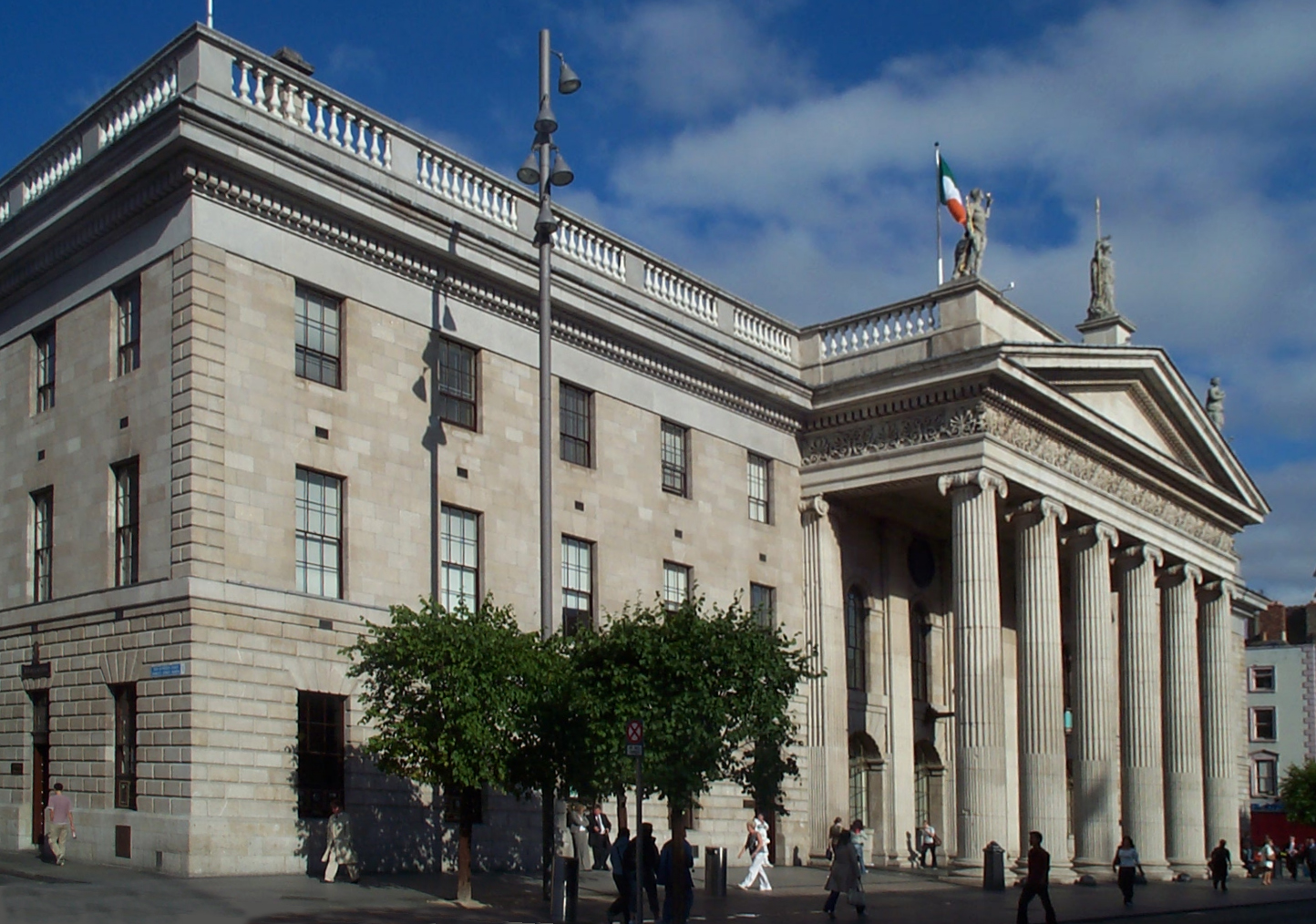
The General Post Office in Dublin, former headquarters of An Post

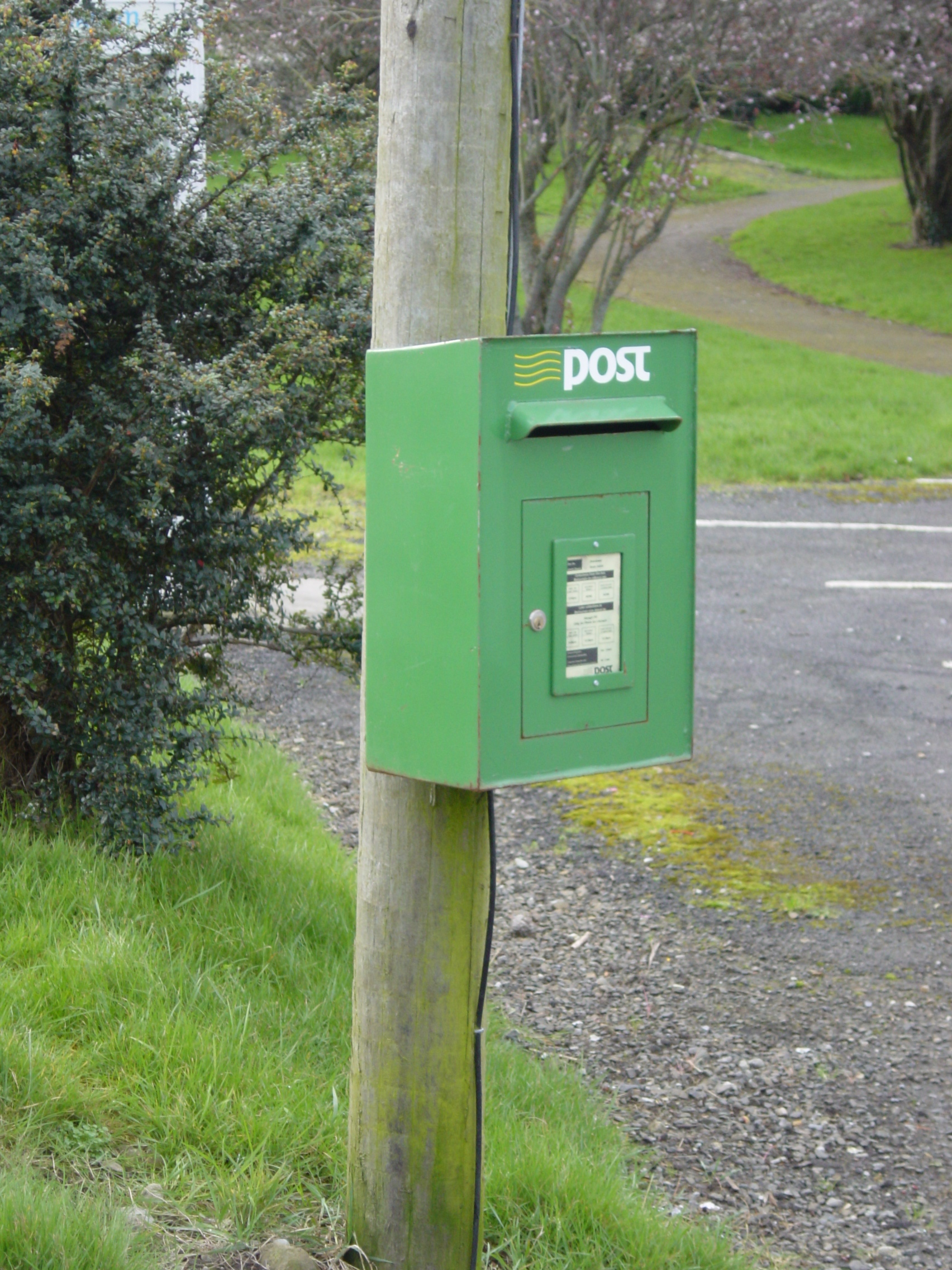
A small An Post post box attached to a telephone or electricity pole, or street light, is usually called a lamp box.

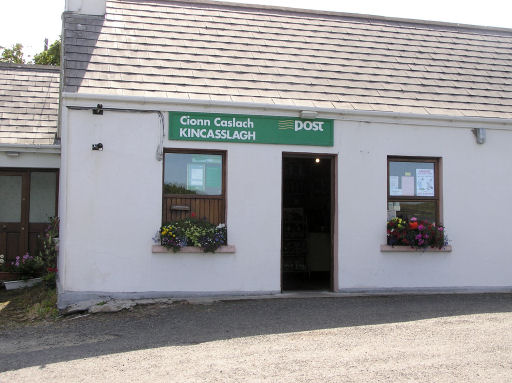
Post office in Kincasslagh, County Donegal

An Post, the Irish postal service, came into being in 1984 when, under the terms of the Postal and Telecommunications Services Act 1983, the Post Office services of the Department of Posts and Telegraphs (P&T) were divided between An Post and Telecom Éireann, the telecommunications operator (rebranded as Eircom after privatisation in 1999 and in 2015 as Eir). At its inception, during the early years of the Irish Free State, the Department of Posts and Telegraphs was the country's largest department of state, and its employees (most of them postmen) constituted the largest sector of the civil service.

Prior to this, the Post Office in Ireland had been under the control of various Postmasters General, Irish and British, with the appointment of Evan Vaughan as postmaster in Dublin in 1638, generally accepted as the date for the establishment of a semi-formal postal system in Ireland. Oliver Cromwell's Postal Act of 1657 created a combined General Post Office for the three kingdoms of Ireland, Scotland, and England; the position was affirmed by Charles II and his parliament by the Post Office Act 1660.

As of 2020, An Post remains one of Ireland's largest employers but it has undergone considerable downsizing. In 2020, Munster's only sorting centre in Little Island, Cork closed. The closure of individual branches in rural areas has become a significant political issue. In 2014, all parts of An Post made a profit for the first time in eight years. As of 2018 there were approximately 1,100 An Post offices and over 100 postal agents across Ireland.

The Irish government announced the introduction of a postcode system, Eircode, in Ireland from 2008 though An Post was against the system at the time, saying it was unnecessary. The introduction of Eircodes took place on 13 July 2015, after almost a decade of delays.

All parcels arriving in Ireland pass through An Post's mail centre in Portlaoise, where customs officials are on duty to inspect them.

An Post adopted its current logo on 14 December 2018; it did not make its first appearance until 13 March 2019. On branded signage, individual post offices are labelled Oifig an Phoist or (in English) 'Post Office'. (Note: In recent signage, "An Post" has been stylized in all-lowercase as "an post"; the 1984–2018 logo simply read "post", with a wavy cancellation-mark icon to its left. "Oifig an Phoist" and "Post Office" have logos with the words run together but parts of them boldfaced, as "Oifigan Phoist" and "PostOffice", respectively. "An Post" becomes "an Phoist" in the combined form due to lenition in the Irish language. While "An Post" literally translates to 'The Post', and "Oifig an Phoist" to 'Office of the Post', those translations are not official names used by the organisation; "Post Office", however, is one. The longer names primarily refer to any of An Post's storefront locations, rather than to the legal entity, similar to American use of "U.S. Post Office" or simply "Post Office" for locations but "U. S. Postal Service" or "USPS" for the organisation.)

On 22 June 2023, An Post moved from its historic headquarters in the General Post Office building on O'Connell Street in Dublin to new premises at North Wall Quay.

== Subsidiaries and joint ventures ==
An Post is involved in a number of joint venture operations and also has several subsidiaries. It has complete ownership of some of these, while it is part-owner of others, such as the An Post National Lottery Company and the Prize Bond Company Limited.

=== An Post National Lottery Company ===
An Post held the licence granted by the Minister for Finance to run the National Lottery through its subsidiary, An Post National Lottery Company until February 2014. All employees of An Post National Lottery Company were seconded from An Post, and as such were employed and paid by An Post rather than by the subsidiary. Since 2014, the National Lottery has been operated by Premier Lotteries Ireland, in which An Post is a stakeholder.

=== An Post Transaction Services ===
In 2003, An Post set up a new division to run its post office and transaction services business, entitled An Post Transaction Services or PostTS. It rebranded its post offices network as "Post Office" or "Oifig an Phoist" with a new, white-and-red logo, and introduced banking services in conjunction with Allied Irish Banks. This followed the introduction of a service whereby newsagents could provide some Post Office services. This service, entitled PostPoint and operated as subsidiary of An Post, was originally formed in 2000 to sell mobile phone top-ups over-the-counter to Eircell subscribers.

In 2005 PostTS sold its foreign operations, and the rebranding effort largely reversed, with the traditional An Post logo restored to Post Offices. Between 2005 and 2006, An Post sold its interest in the Post TS UK and An Post Transaction Services businesses to Alphyra, for a reported €59.3M.

=== Geodirectory ===
Jointly established by An Post and Ordnance Survey Ireland, Geodirectory is a service that provides a database of buildings and addresses in Ireland, as well as their geolocation details. It holds records for 2.2 million properties that receive post. GeoDirectory assigns each property its own individual "fingerprint" – a unique, verified address in a standardised format, together with a geocode which identifies every property in the country. Geodirectory also operates a mobile app called GeoFindIT.

=== Postbank ===
On 5 October 2006 An Post signed an agreement for the creation of a joint venture with Fortis to provide financial services through the Post Office network. This joint venture with BNP Paribas was created to offer financial products and services to the Irish market, including daily banking, savings products, insurance, mortgages, and credit cards. PostPoint and the company's insurance business, One Direct, was to become part of the new company, with access to the Post Office network. In April 2007 a press launch was held for the new bank, which is to be known as Postbank (legally Postbank Ireland Limited, to distinguish from other similarly named operations such as Deutsche Postbank). By February 2010, the closure of the Postbank unit had been announced, and the operation was wound down by the end of December 2010.

Some counter business for AIB, Bank of Ireland and Ulster Bank can also be conducted at post offices.

=== Postbus ===
Between 1984 and 2004 the company operated a postbus route linking Ennis with parts of County Clare.

=== Television licensing ===
Television licensing is administered by An Post. It is responsible for the collection of revenue, inspection, and prosecution in cases of non-payment of the licence on behalf of the state.

=== An Post Mobile ===
An Post runs a mobile virtual network operator (MVNO) using Vodafone's Irish network.

=== AddressPal ===
In 2017, An Post launched AddressPal, a package forwarding service, operating through its subsidiary Air Business in St Albans, Hertfordshire, England. The service allows customers to shop from the UK and US using a proxy address allowing items to be delivered to their home address in Ireland.

In October 2018, Air Business relocated to Hatfield Business Park in nearby Hatfield.

== Developments ==
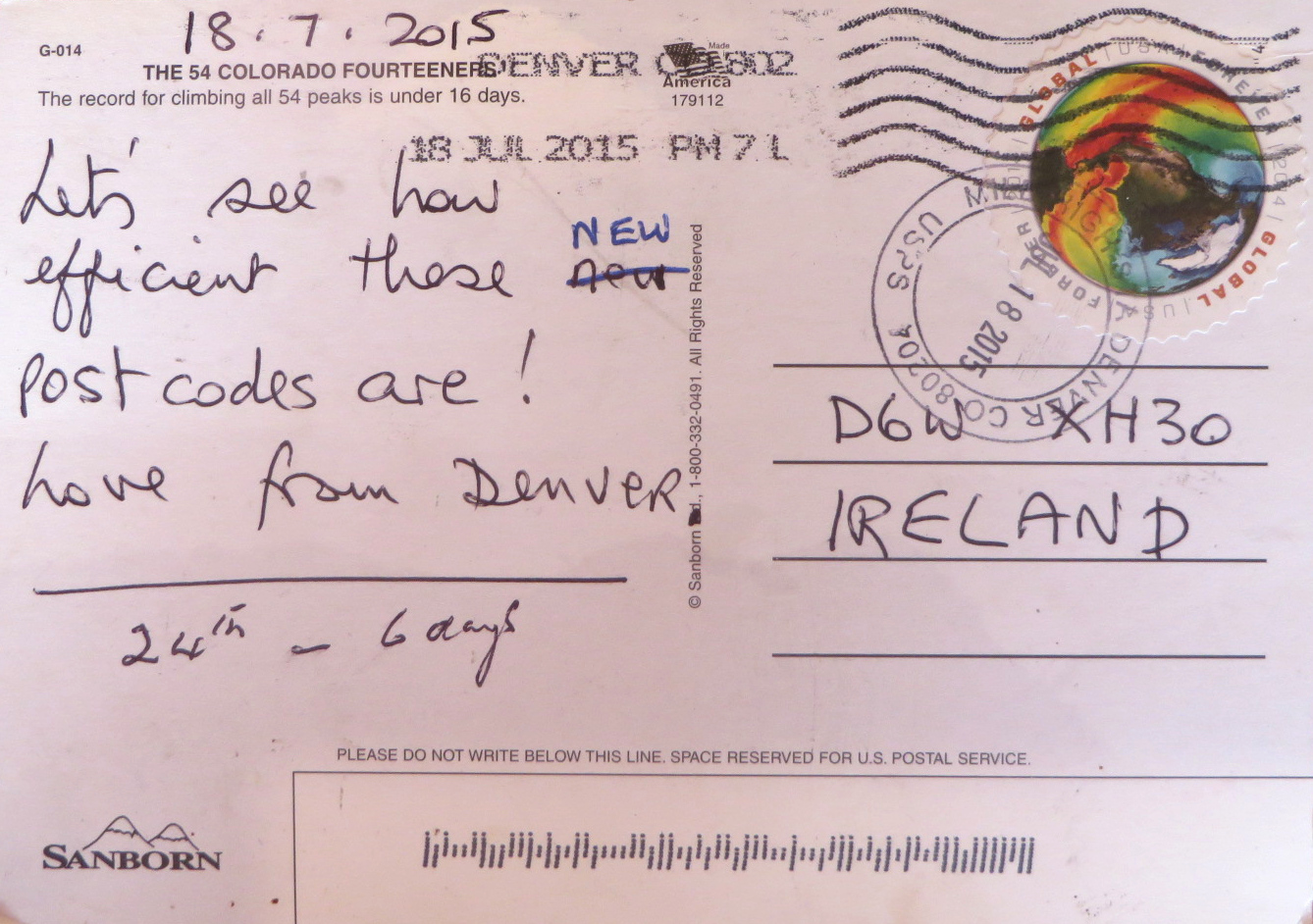
Postcard sent from the United States to a home in Ireland. No addressee name, street address, or town was provided but the card was correctly delivered days later because each Irish address has a unique Eircode.

In 2009, An Post sponsored a postcard project, called "C Both Sides", which ran for a year, with the public being invited to create postcards on different themes.

In February 2012, the Commission for Communications Regulation (ComReg) launched legal proceedings against An Post over the quality of its service. An Post said it was "puzzled" by the decision.

In August 2018, it was announced that all post offices serving communities of fewer than 500 people (excluding offshore islands) were to be closed. However, three of these 159 branches were "spared" closure following local campaigns at Ballinskelligs (Kerry), Cliffoney (Sligo), and Ballycroy (Mayo).

== See also ==
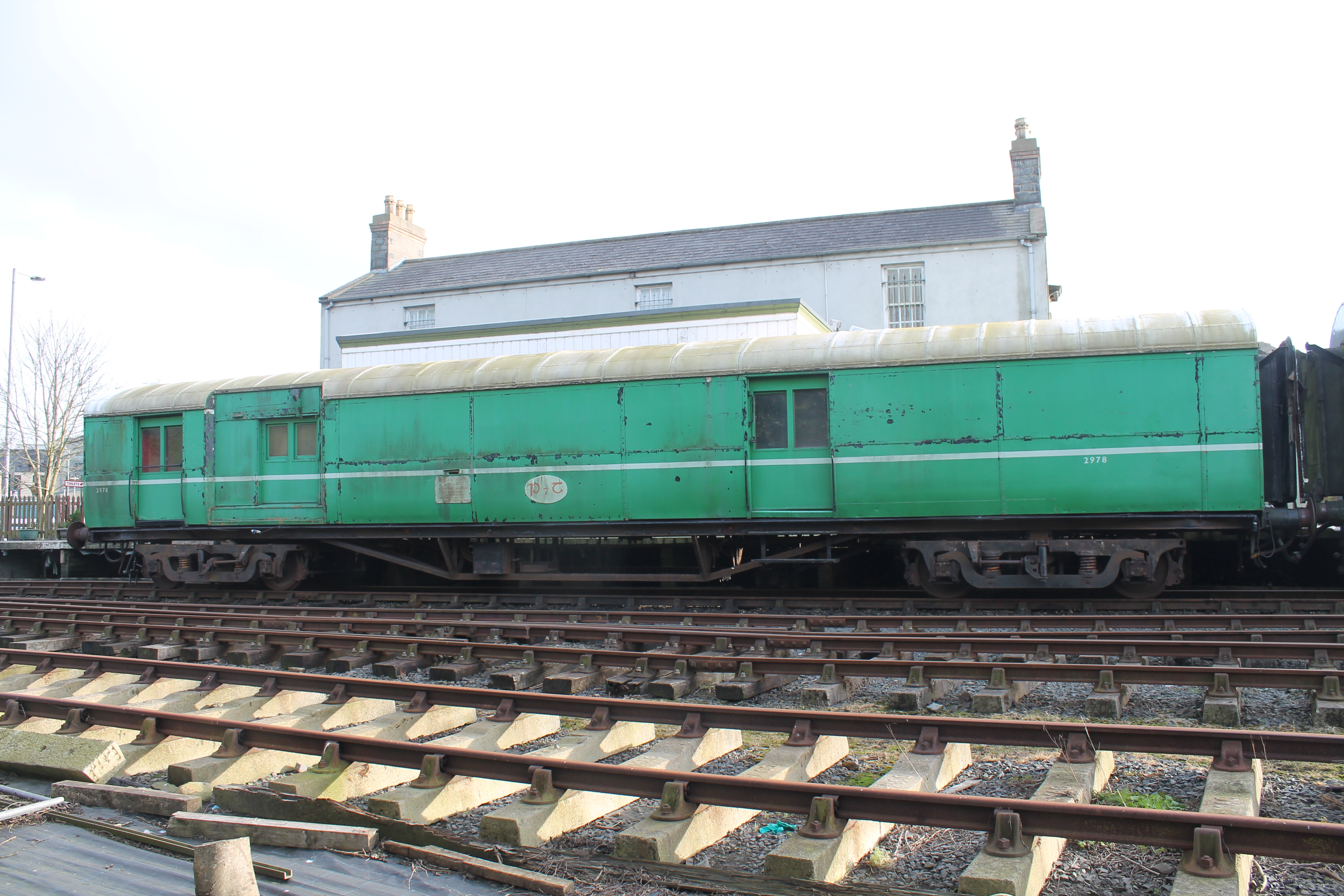
Former An Post travelling post office at the Downpatrick and County Down Railway. A similar TPO survives at Irish Rail's Inchicore Works.

- GPO Museum (ex An Post Museum)
- Communications in Ireland
- List of companies of Ireland
- Postage stamps of Ireland
- Postal addresses in Ireland
- List of national postal services#Europe
