= Ludlow style wall box =

Type of post box

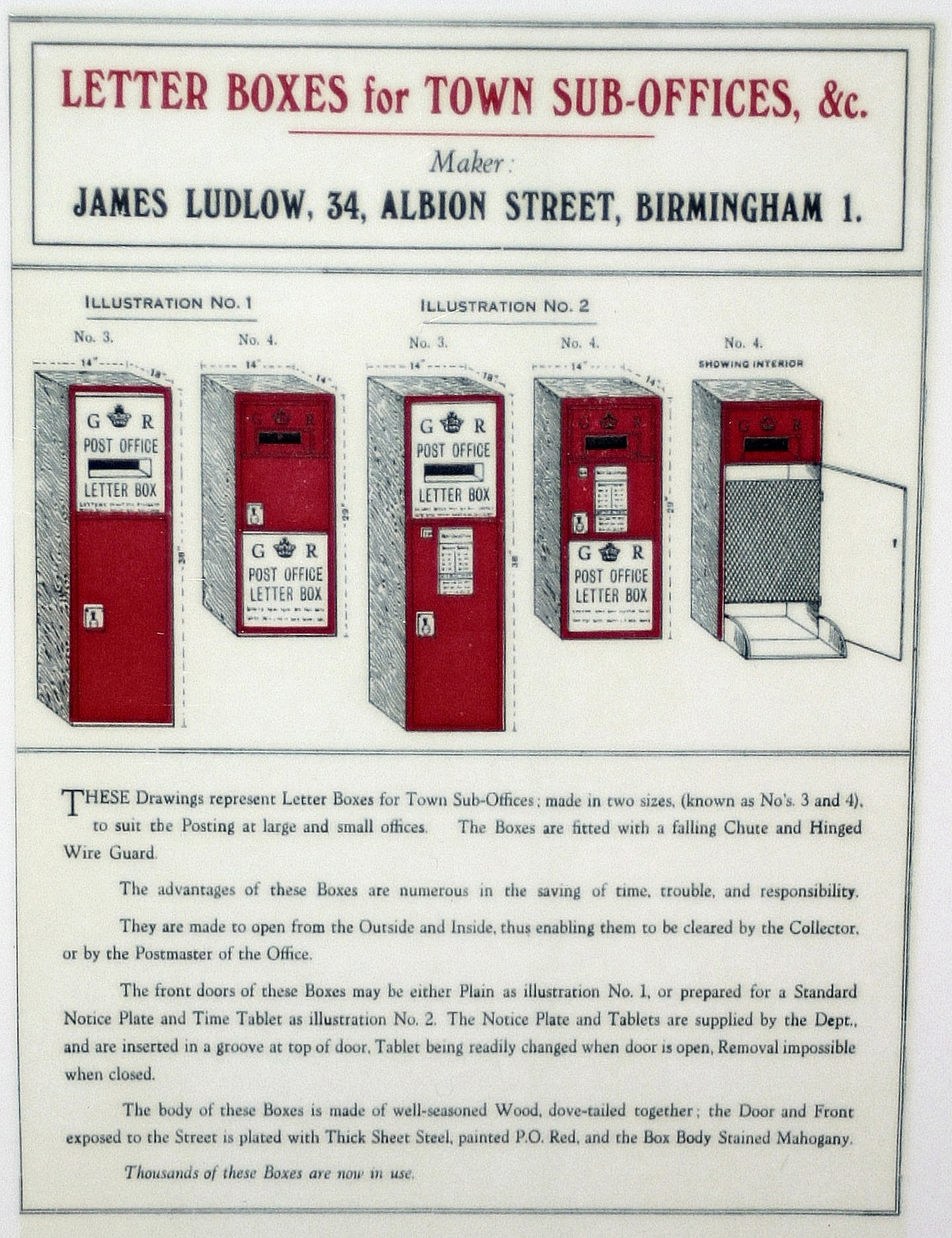
A page from a 1910 Ludlow advertising brochure

In the United Kingdom, a Ludlow style wall box is a post box where mail is deposited to be collected by the Royal Mail. They are built into stone pillars or the walls of buildings and are never found free-standing. This is because they are made largely from wood. They were nearly all made by the now-defunct company of James Ludlow & Son of Birmingham, whose name they take. Similar designs exist as historical artefacts in certain Commonwealth countries. Ludlow style boxes have been in use since 1885 and were in continuous manufacture until 1965.

According to the Letter Box Study Group (LBSG), there are more than 450 locations in the UK and Republic of Ireland where Ludlow post boxes are in use, stored or preserved. As Royal Mail estimates that there are over 100,000 post boxes in the UK, the Ludlow style boxes represent a very small group of nonetheless important designs.

== Early history ==
The earliest use of a Ludlow style box came in 1885, but the very first boxes in the style were made by the Eagle Range and Foundry Company or E.R. Cole & Co and not by James Ludlow & Son. They are grouped together under the generic term "Ludlow boxes" as those made by James Ludlow & Son are by far the most prevalent. According to LBSG records only two E.R. Cole boxes survive in service in the UK and only a handful of Eagle Range and Foundry boxes.

== Construction ==
Ludlow boxes are special because unlike traditional cast iron post boxes, they are made largely of wood. There are two standard sizes, small and large. The construction of both is a simple rustic pine box which may have doors at the front only or at front and back. In the smaller style the front door is surrounded by a cast iron decorative beading and surmounted by a cast aperture or mouth-piece which bears the cypher of the reigning British monarch at the time of supply. Ludlow boxes can hence be found bearing the cyphers of Queen Victoria, Edward VII, George V, Edward VIII, George VI and Elizabeth II. Below the aperture casting is a wooden door which is faced with thin sheet steel at the top and a decorative enamel plate at the bottom. The plate normally bears the Royal Cypher and the wording "POST OFFICE LETTER BOX". It may also contain a recessed collection time plate and a "Next collection" tablet. It will normally be fitted with a brass five-lever Chubb lock on the inside and may have a lock escutcheon on the outside.

Until 1952 the larger style had no top casting, the area being covered by an enamel decorative plate which itself has an aperture through the middle. In this case the longer door may have a collection plate and tablet holder and again will carry a Chubb lock and may be fitted with an escutcheon. From 1952 however, the design was modified so that the casting from the smaller style box could be used instead of the enamel plate. It was uniform with the smaller style and both of these later EIIR boxes carry a cast plaque on the lower door reading "Post Office". In Scotland, this style of box featured apertures showing the Crown of Scotland.

== General use ==
Ludlow boxes were introduced because, until 1910, sub-postmasters were responsible for the provision of secure posting facilities in their post offices. As the traditional cast iron boxes were heavy and expensive, James Ludlow & Son introduced a range of much cheaper boxes which they could supply at a competitive price to sub-postmasters. They were also to be seen in large country houses, public buildings and hotels.

James Ludlow manufactured the boxes in various styles and produced colour leaflets describing the boxes.

At their height, it is estimated that there were some 5,000–7,000 Ludlow boxes in use in the UK. As the network of post offices has contracted, many of these have been withdrawn from service and removed until today there are around 450 left.

== Gallery ==
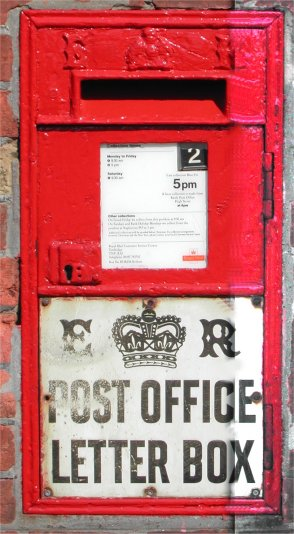
Edward VII Ludlow small type at Bodiam sub-post office (SPO), Kent.

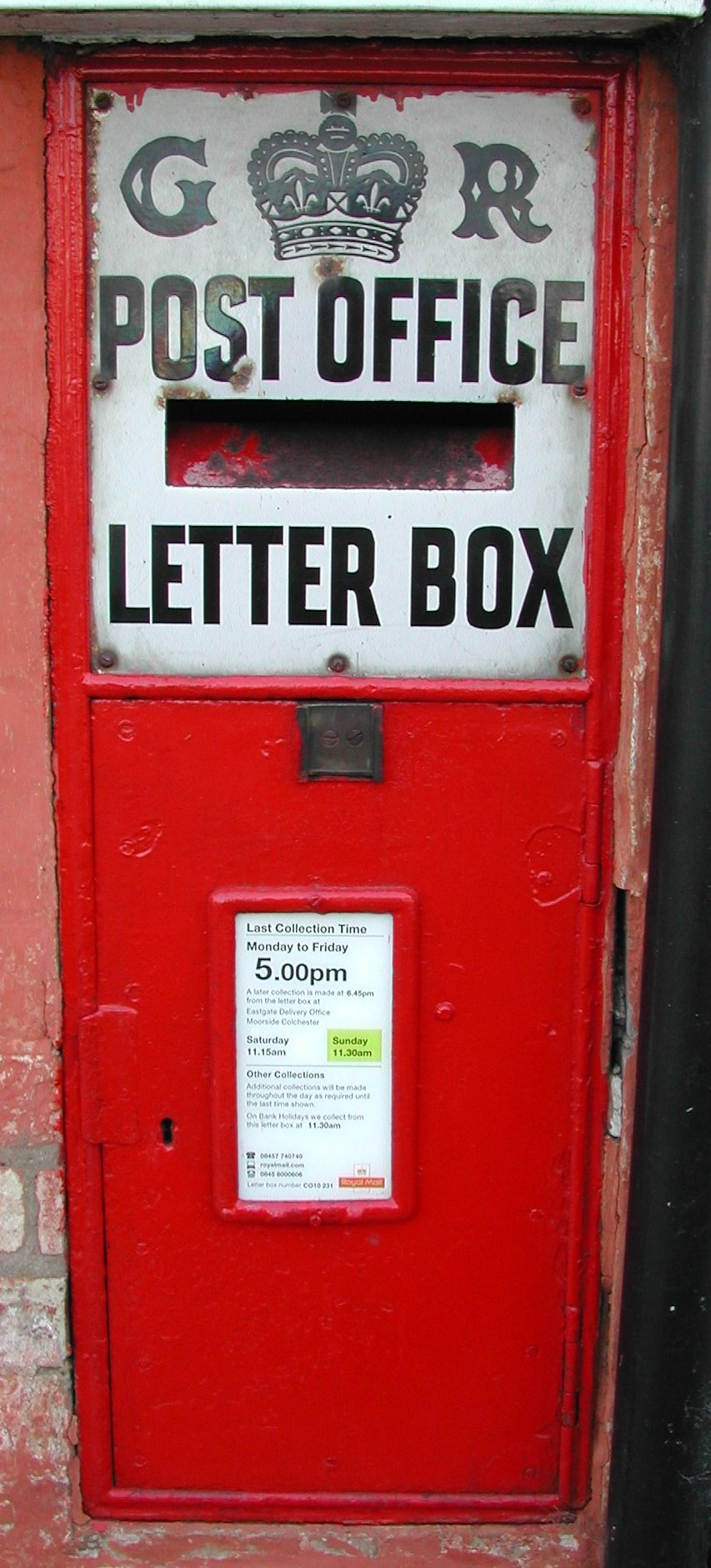
A large long-door George V Ludlow at Boxford ex-SPO, Suffolk.

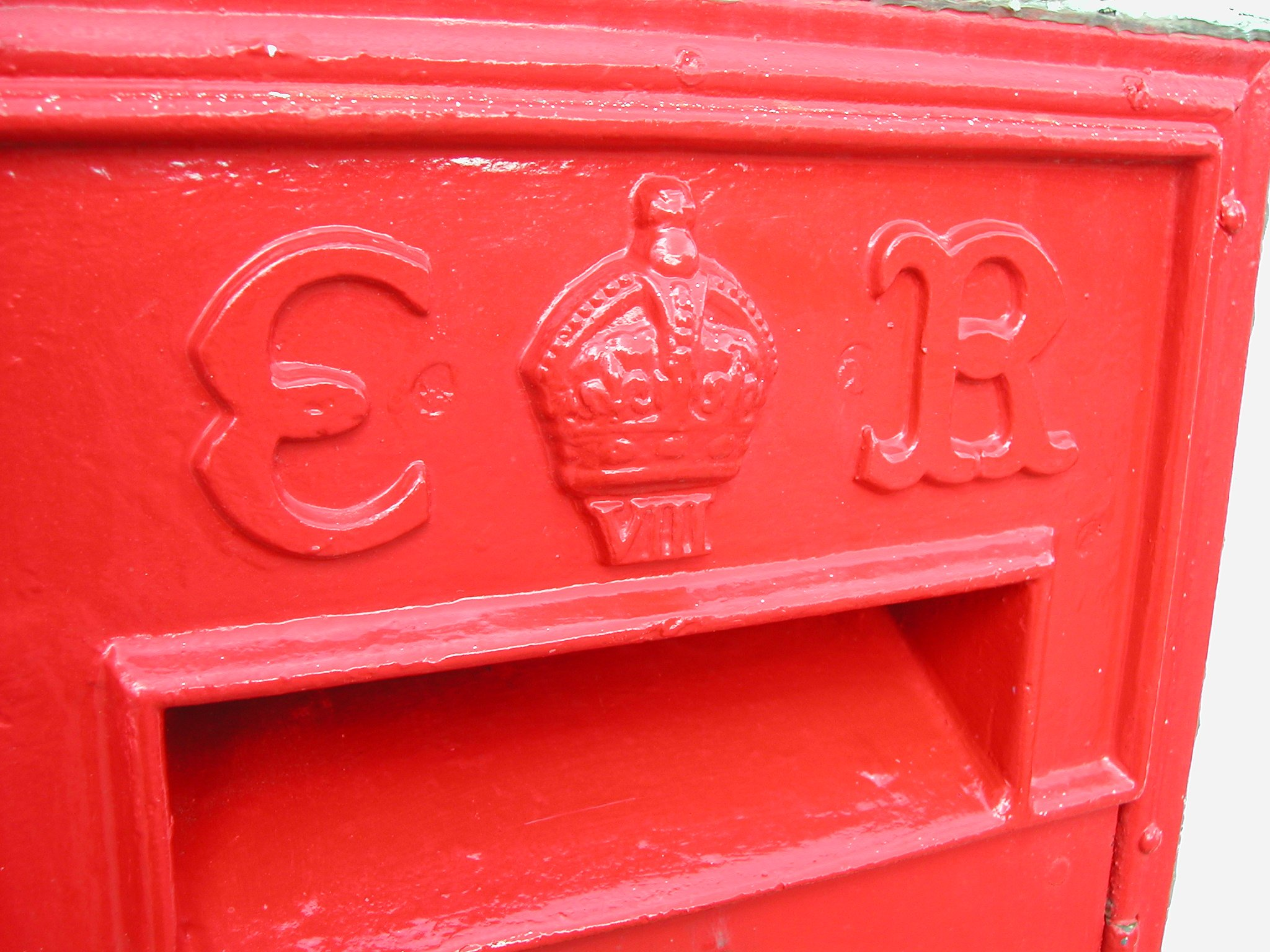
Detail of the EVIIIR Ludlow at Bawdsey, Suffolk.

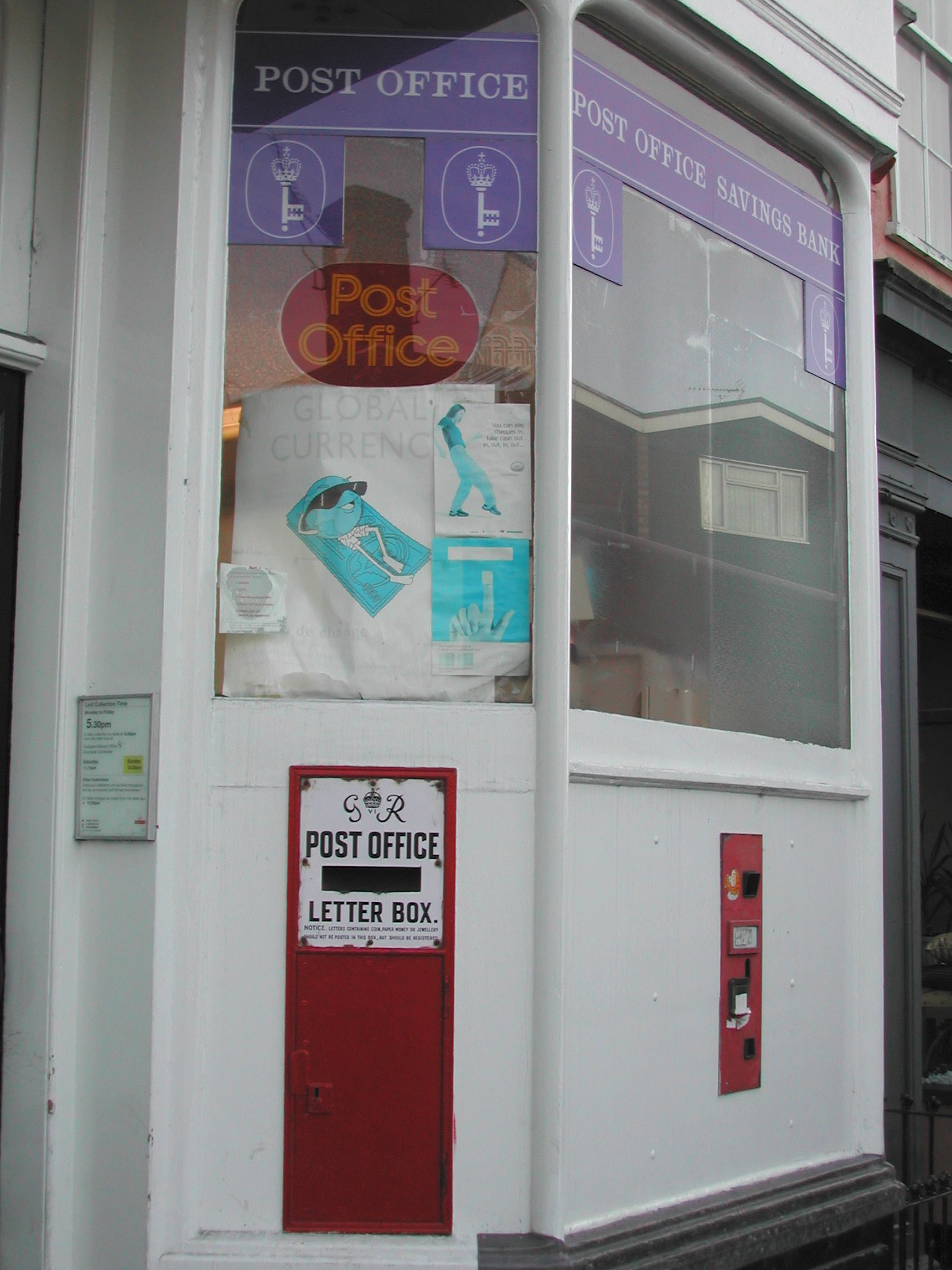
A Ludlow in a post office window at Coggeshall, Essex.

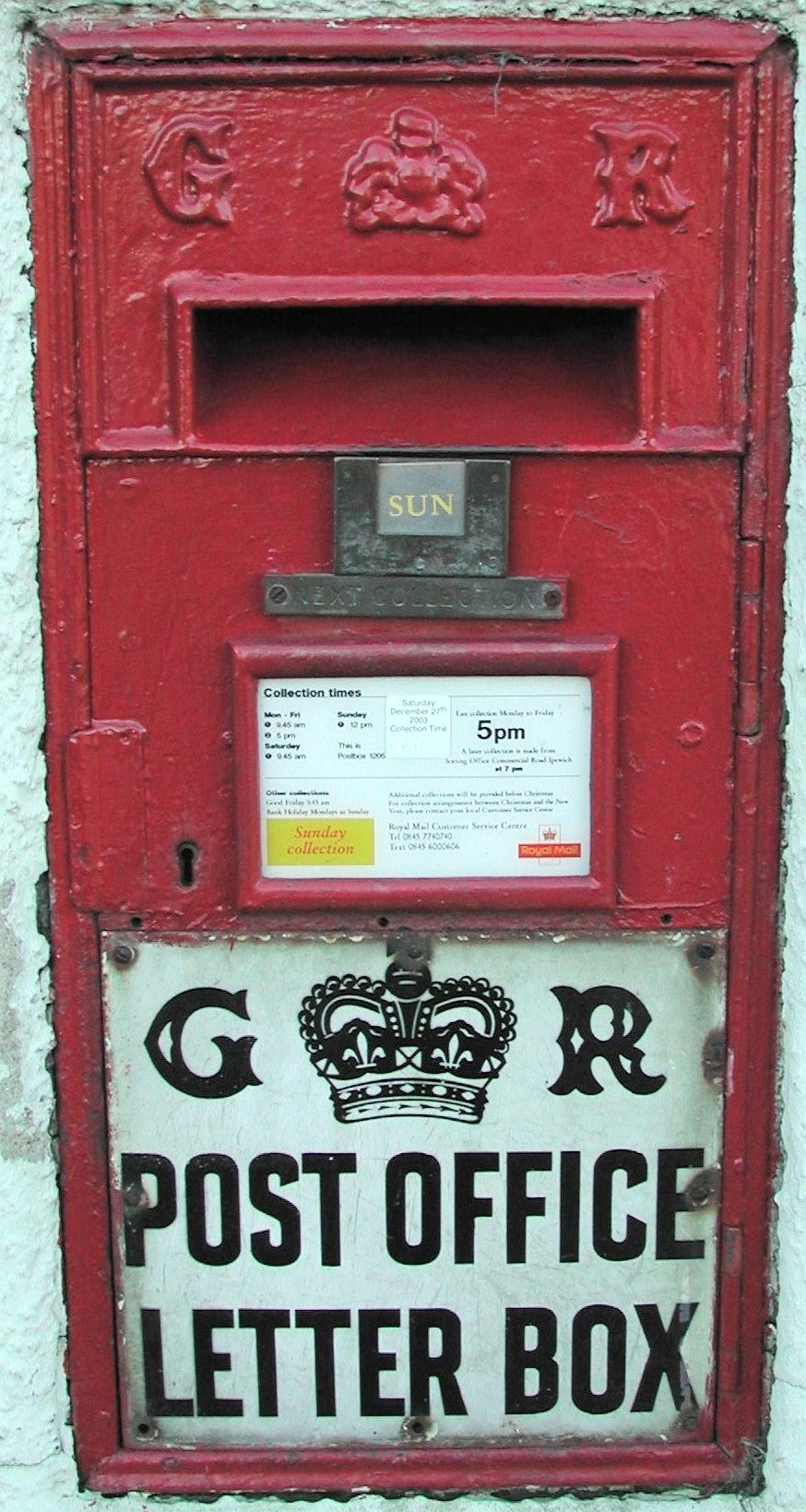
Boxted, Suffolk: small George V Ludlow with added CP and tablet.

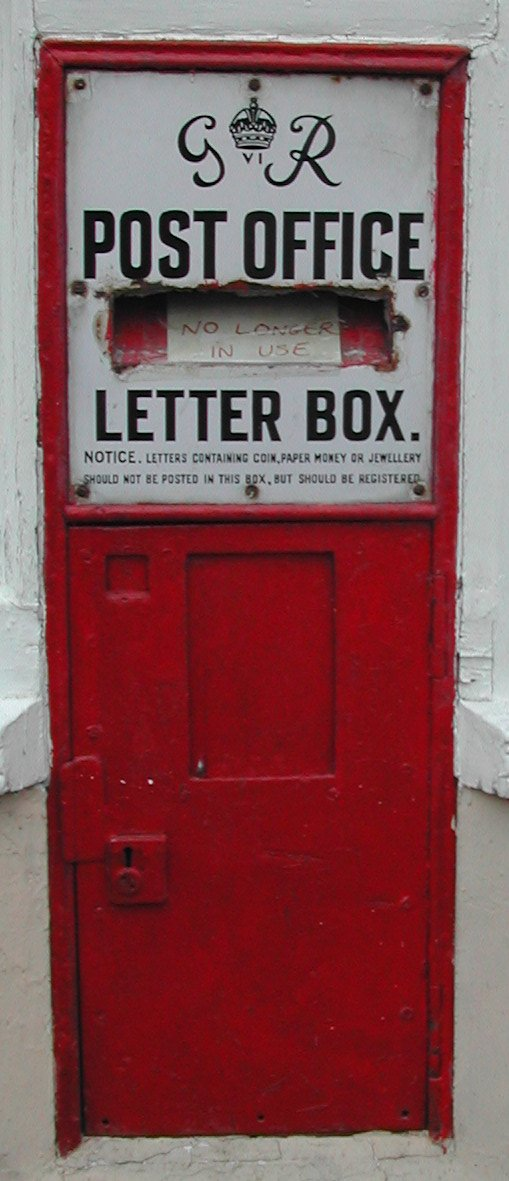
A GVIR long-door box at former SPO in Clare, Suffolk.

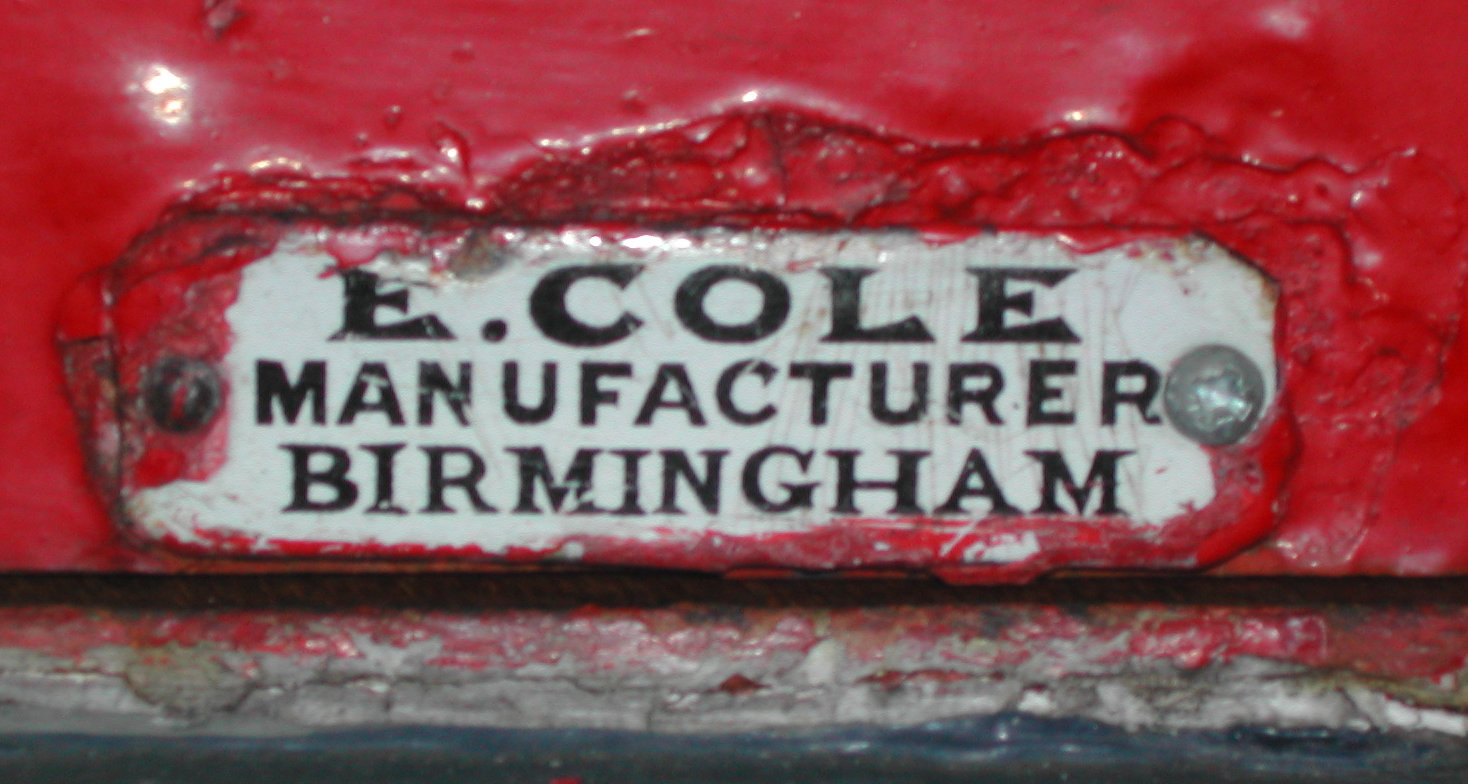
Detail of the Cole maker's plate on the Victorian Ludlow at Winchester City SPO, Hampshire.

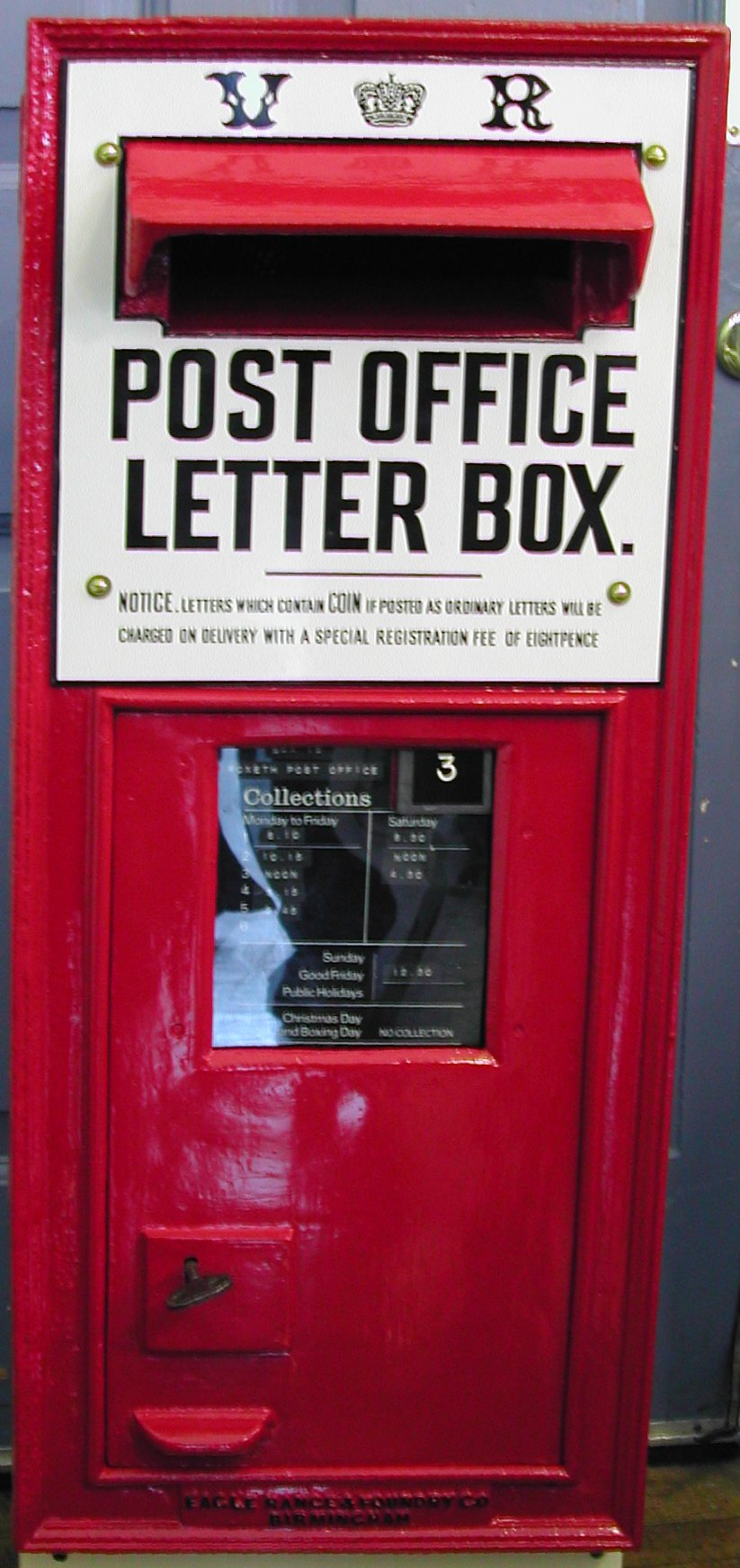
Queen Victoria Ludlow-style box by Eagle Range and Foundry in the Inkpen Postal Museum, Taunton, Somerset.

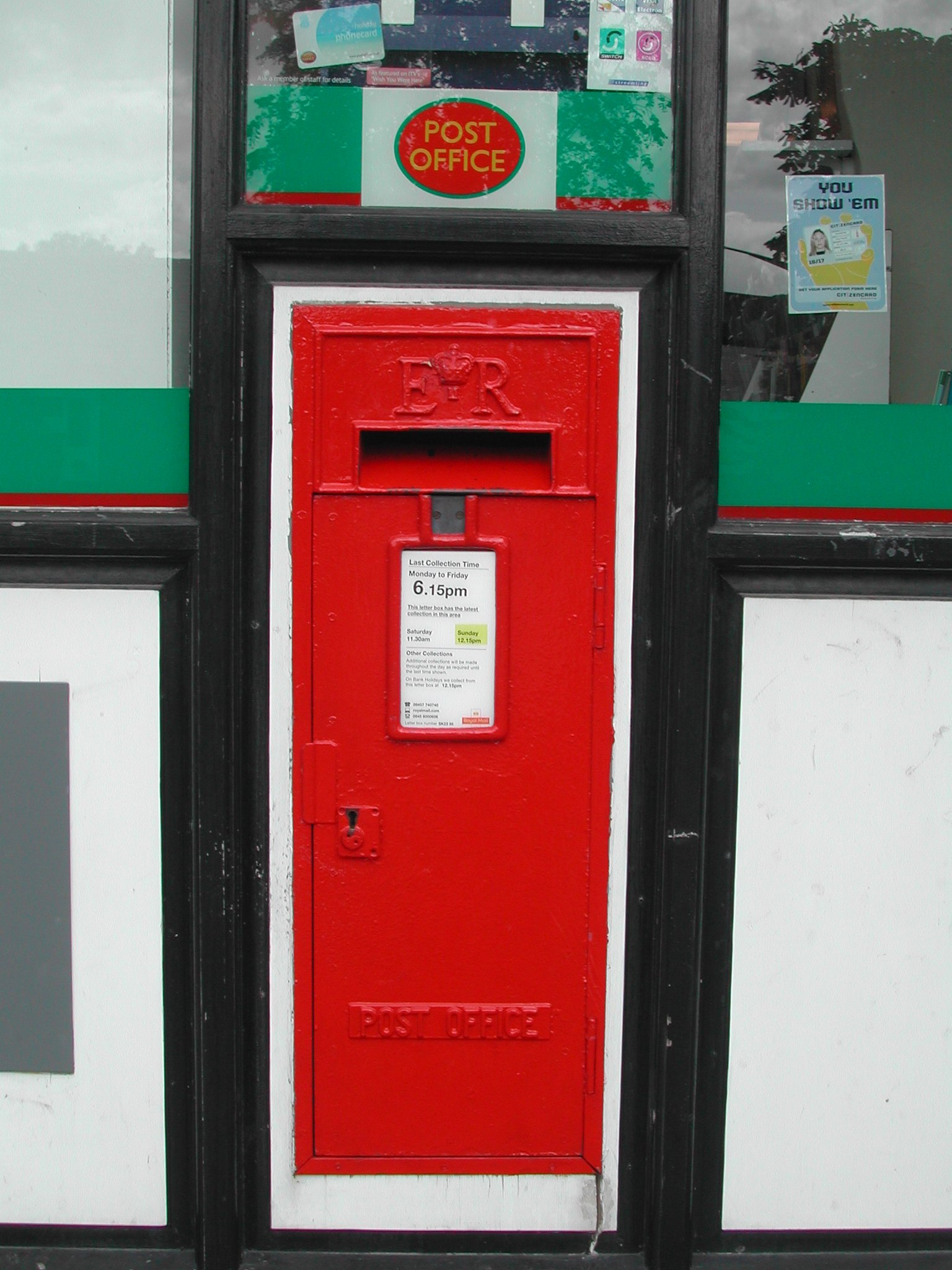
A later EIIR Ludlow at Chapel-en-le-Frith SPO, Derbyshire showing the cast Post Office plate.

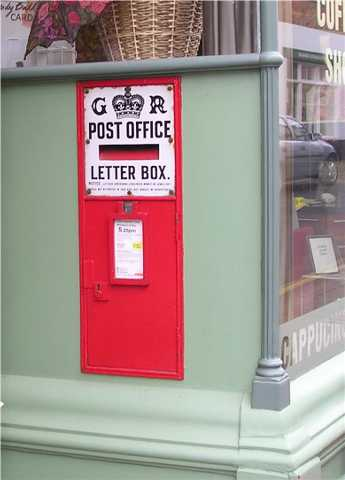
Ludlow built into a shop window in Walsingham, Norfolk.

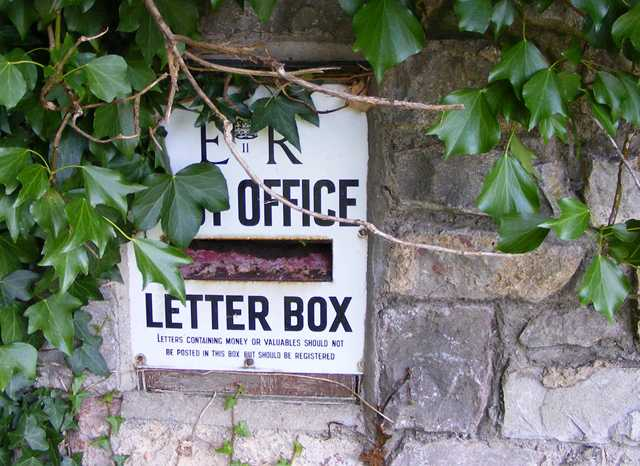
Ludlow EIIR plate, now disused, built into a garden wall at a country house in North Wales.

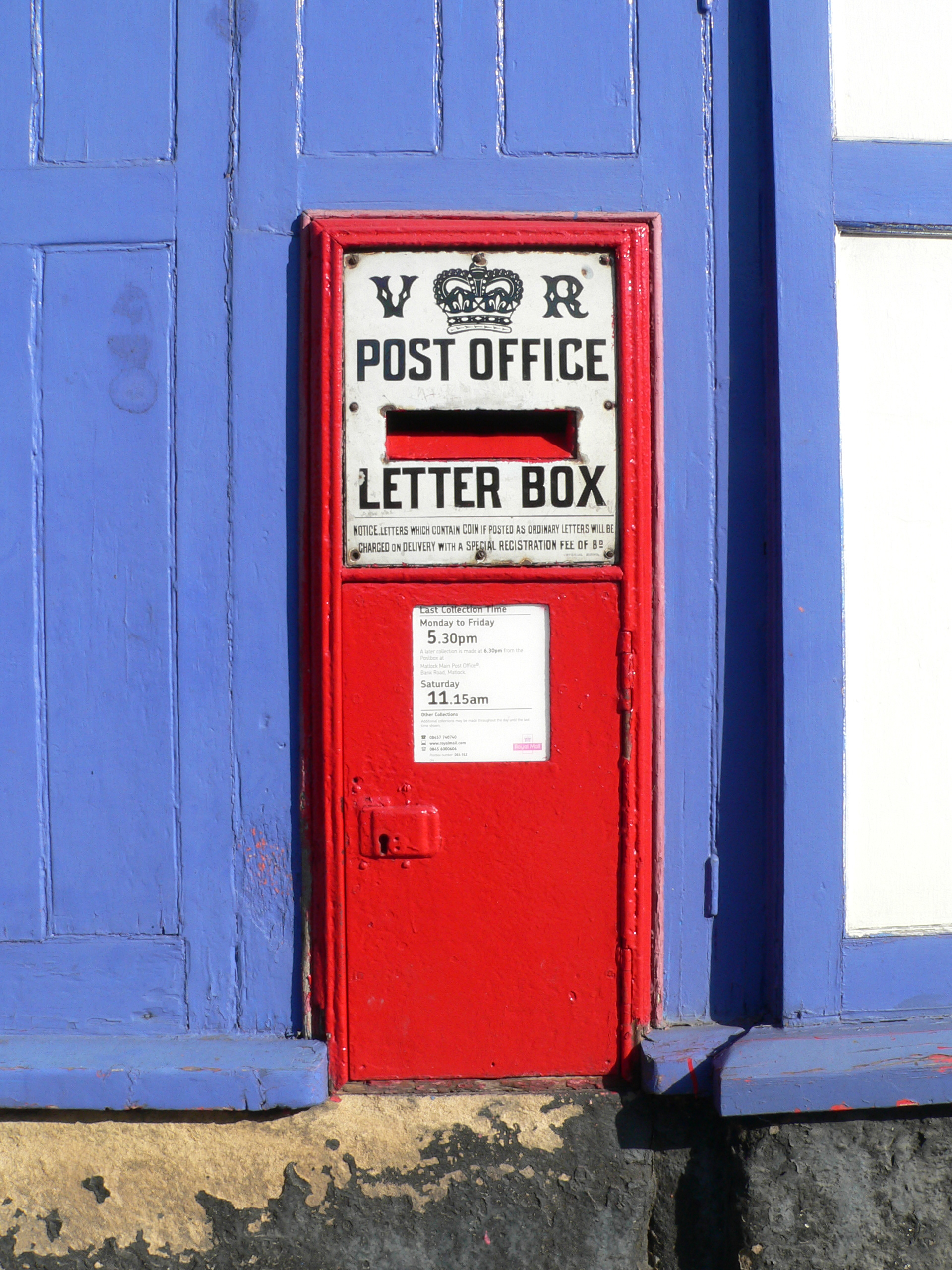
A VR Ludlow box at Matlock Green PO, Derbyshire, England.

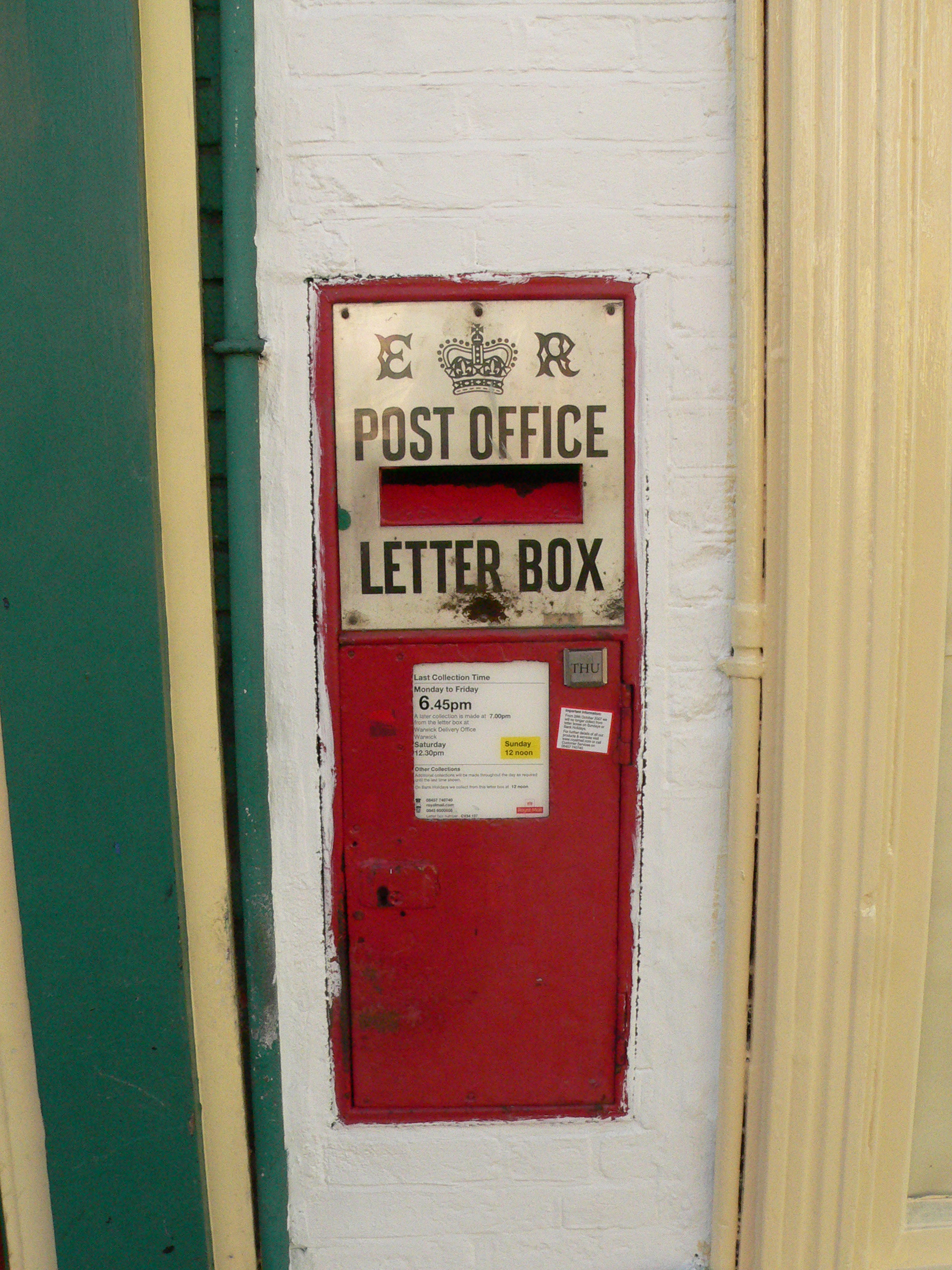
An EVIIR Ludlow box at a sub- post office in Warwick, England.

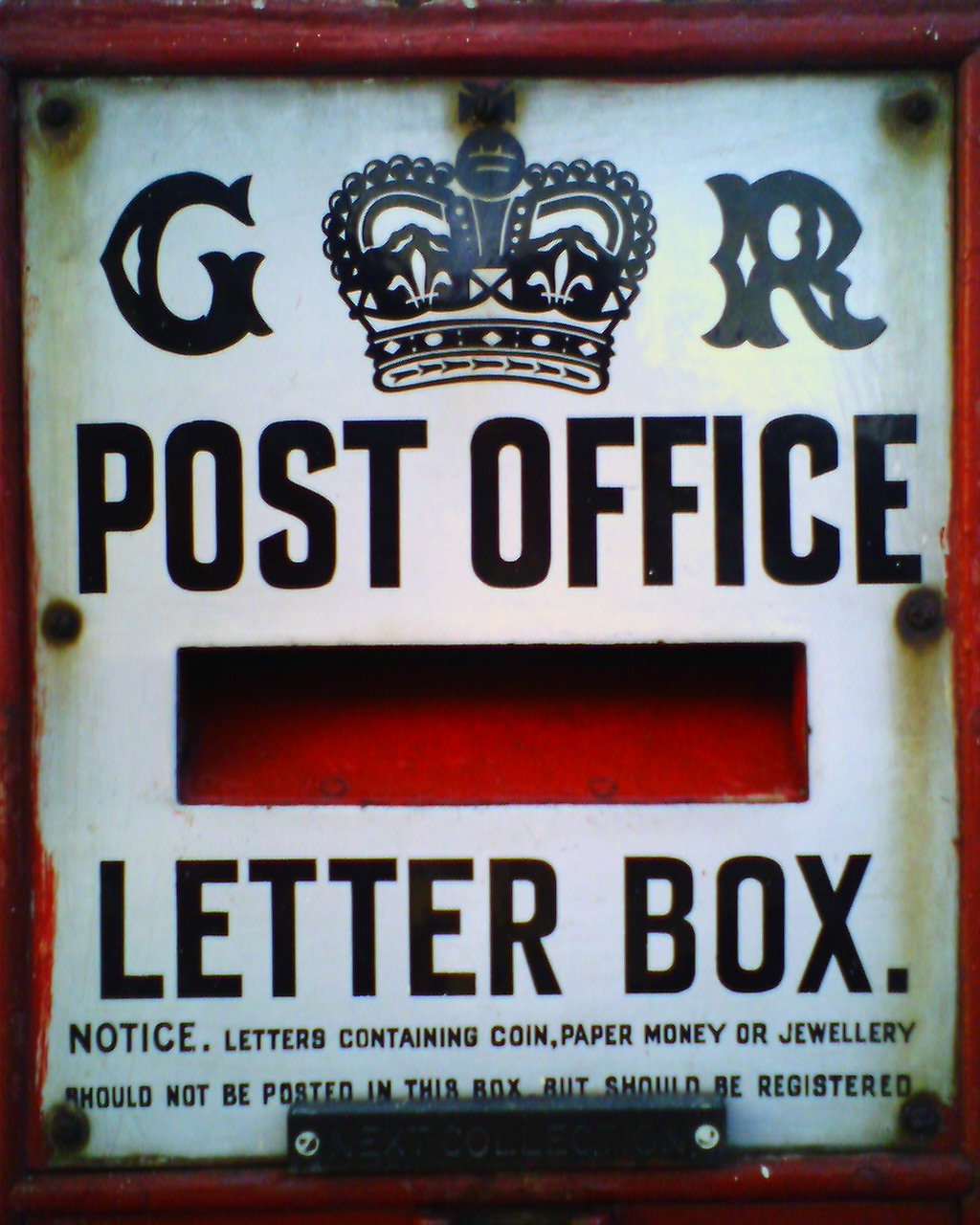
A close-up of the enamel plate on a GR Ludlow box.

== See also ==
- Pillar box
- Lamp box
- Post box
- Wall box
