= Lamp box =

Type of post box

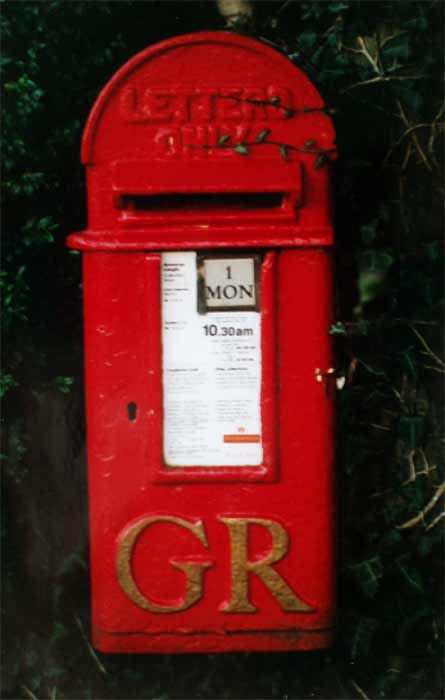
A George V lamp box at Tal-y-llyn, Wales, with a bi-lingual collection plate

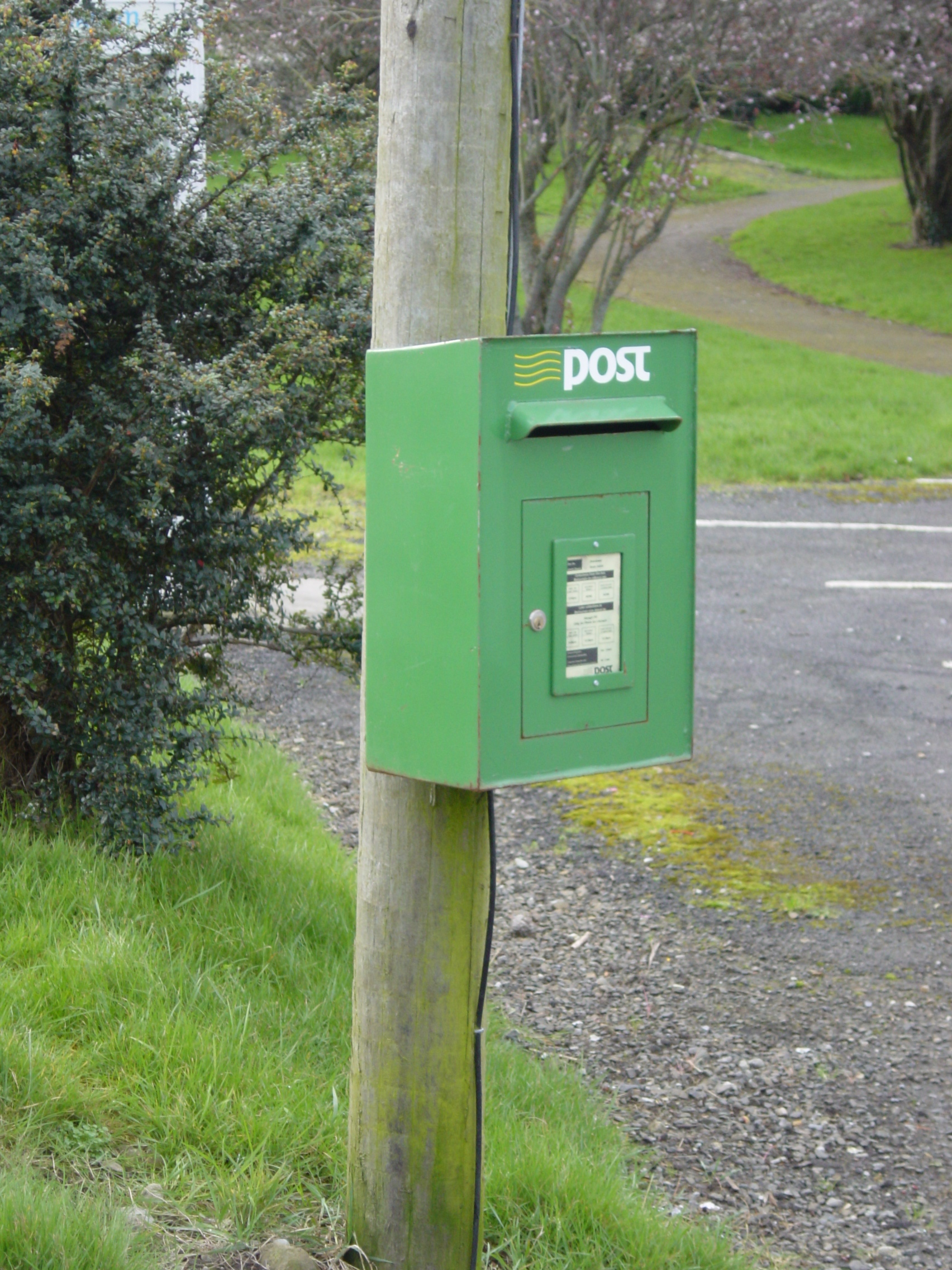
An Post lamp box in Ireland, attached to a telegraph post. British examples in Ireland also exist but have been painted green.

Lamp boxes are the smallest of the post boxes used by the Royal Mail in the UK, by its counterparts in the Commonwealth of Nations and also by An Post in Ireland. Their name derives from the fact that they were designed to be affixed to lamp posts, although they may equally be found embedded in walls or mounted on poles.

Lamp boxes were introduced on an experimental basis in September 1896, being used in parts of London as an inexpensive means of supplementing the existing Pillar box network. By July 1897 these boxes had proved successful and from then on their use spread to rural areas where the greater expense of a Ludlow style wall box was not justified.

The original pattern of lamp box was produced from 1896 to circa 1935. During this time there were several variations of styles.

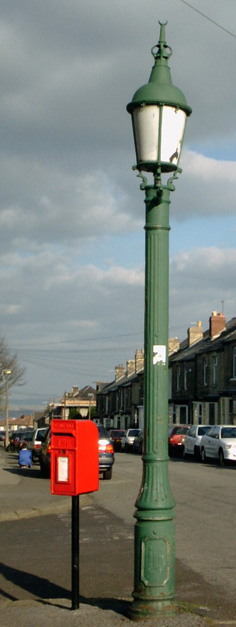
Lamp box mounted next to a sewer gas destructor lamp in Crookes, Sheffield, England.

== Reigns ==
=== Victoria ===
- LB201 - There are few survivors of this type, "Letters" above the aperture.
- LB202 - "Letters Only" was added around July 1897.

Although the lamp boxes were made by the same foundry as the Victorian ciphered pillar boxes, the ciphers differ slightly. The V and R have equal length arms with an oval loop however, no curl on the toe.

=== Edward VII ===
- LB203 - EviiR Open cipher
- LB204 - EviiR Closed cipher, small tablet
- LB205 - EviiR closed cipher large tablet

Again two slightly different ciphers were used from those on the Pillar boxes. With the introduction of the LB205 in 1905 came the larger tablet holder. Prior to this all Lamp boxes used the smaller style tab.

=== George V ===
- LB206- Believed to be cast until about 1927, the original GR Lamp box had a crown above a small GR cipher.
- LB207-LB210 - The crown was removed and a larger GR cipher was used. While the box is 1/2 inch wider the aperture remains the same at 4¾ inches by 1 inch. Subtle differences in the makers name, cipher and door length distinguish between the different types.
- LB211 GvR 1935 Pattern -In response to criticism of the narrow aperture of the original Lamp box a larger model was cast with the aperture enlarged to 5½ inches by 1 inch. This type of Lamp box was in use from 1935 to 1949 when it was replaced with the modern 1940s pattern.

=== George VI ===
- 1936 LB212 The revised 1935 Pattern but carrying the cipher of George VI. As far as is known, no boxes were cast with the cipher of Edward VIII
- 1940 LB213 Designed to be cheaper to make and of larger capacity, the 1940 Pattern was not actually put into production until 1949 due to restrictions on materials caused by World War II

=== Elizabeth II ===
- LB214 1952 LB214 was the first of around twenty variations in the earlier 1940 pattern box during the present reign.
- LB215 Allied Iron Founders
- LB216 Carron Company
- LB216 Carron Company Stirlingshire
- LB217 Carron Company Stirlingshire "1977 pattern"

In 1977, the design was changed so that the cast front was fitted to the galvanised steel back by four riveted lugs rather than 6 internal screws. These are henceforward known as "1977 Pattern". For the first three years the round-profile Collection Plate holder was retained. However, from 1980, they were always supplied with a Universal Collection Plate Holder (UCPH).

- LB 218 Carron Stirlingshire (No "Company" in the name)
- LB 219 Lion Foundry Kirkintilloch
- LB 220 Carronade
- LB 221 Machan Scotland
- LB 222 Abbott Engineering

In 1994, the letters business of the Post Office was split from the retail business. The former retained the title Royal Mail Letters whilst the later became Post Office Counters Ltd. This necessitated changing the castings yet again so that in future they would read Royal Mail rather than Post Office.

- LB223 Machan Scotland

The first new Lamp Letter box design for some years was introduced by Royal Mail in 1999. Designated Type N, or "The Bantam" box, the ultra-modern design is made in traditional cast iron, with polished steel fittings. These are more truly "pedestal boxes" such as Type L and Type M, but due to their size, are considered by the Letter Box Study Group to be Lamp Letter boxes.

- LB224 Type N Bantam box, Machan Engineering Scotland

All of the above Elizabeth II boxes can also be found with the Scottish crown. The new Bantam box is also made with a bi-lingual Welsh/English branding.

- LB3426 stainless steel boxes are produced by RM Manufacturing, Newcastle upon Tyne. (RM Manufacturing is part of Royal Mail Property and Facilities Solutions Ltd).

== Images ==
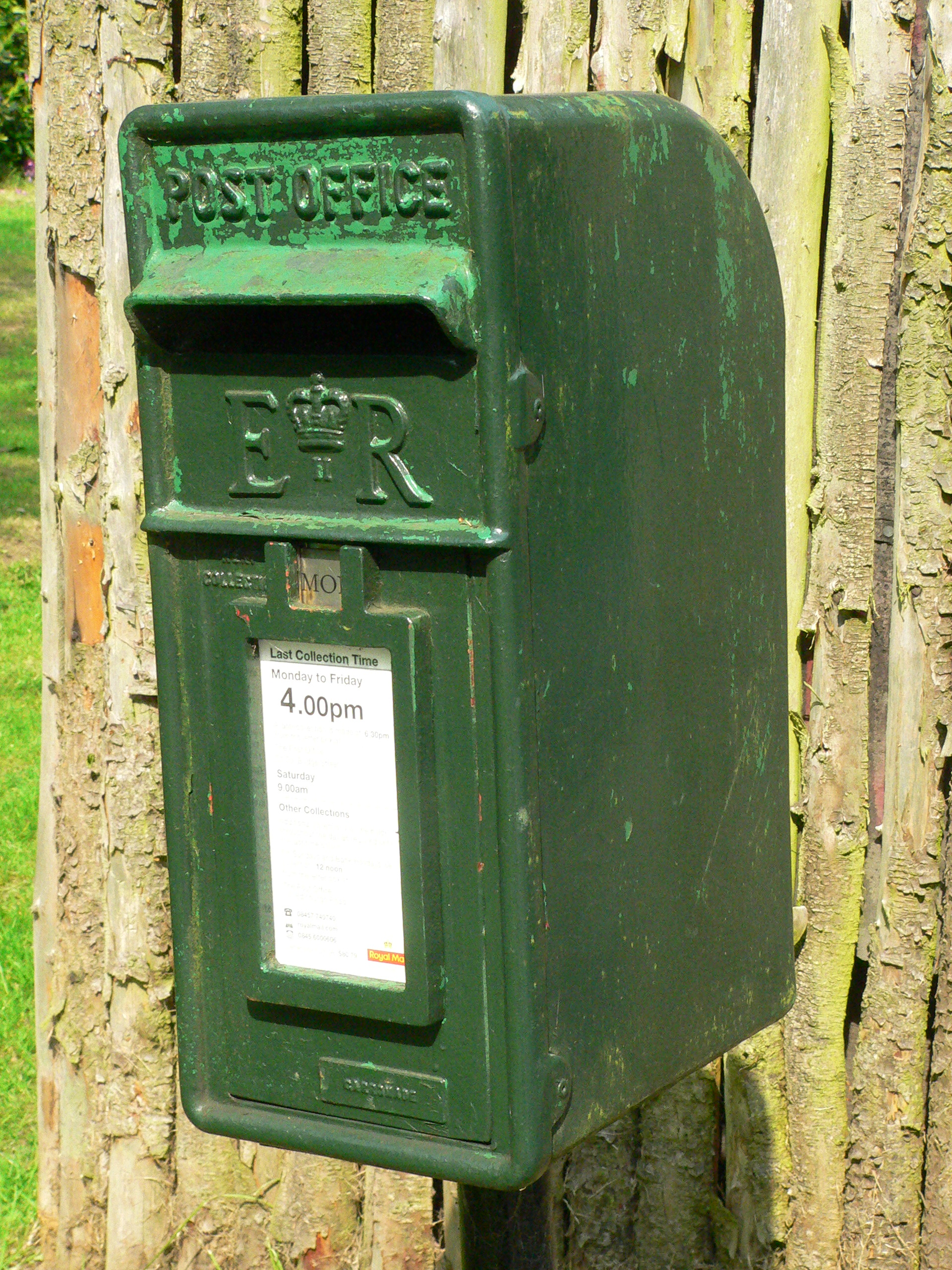
A green lamp box at Clumber Park, Nottinghamshire, England. This box was painted green at the request of the National Trust

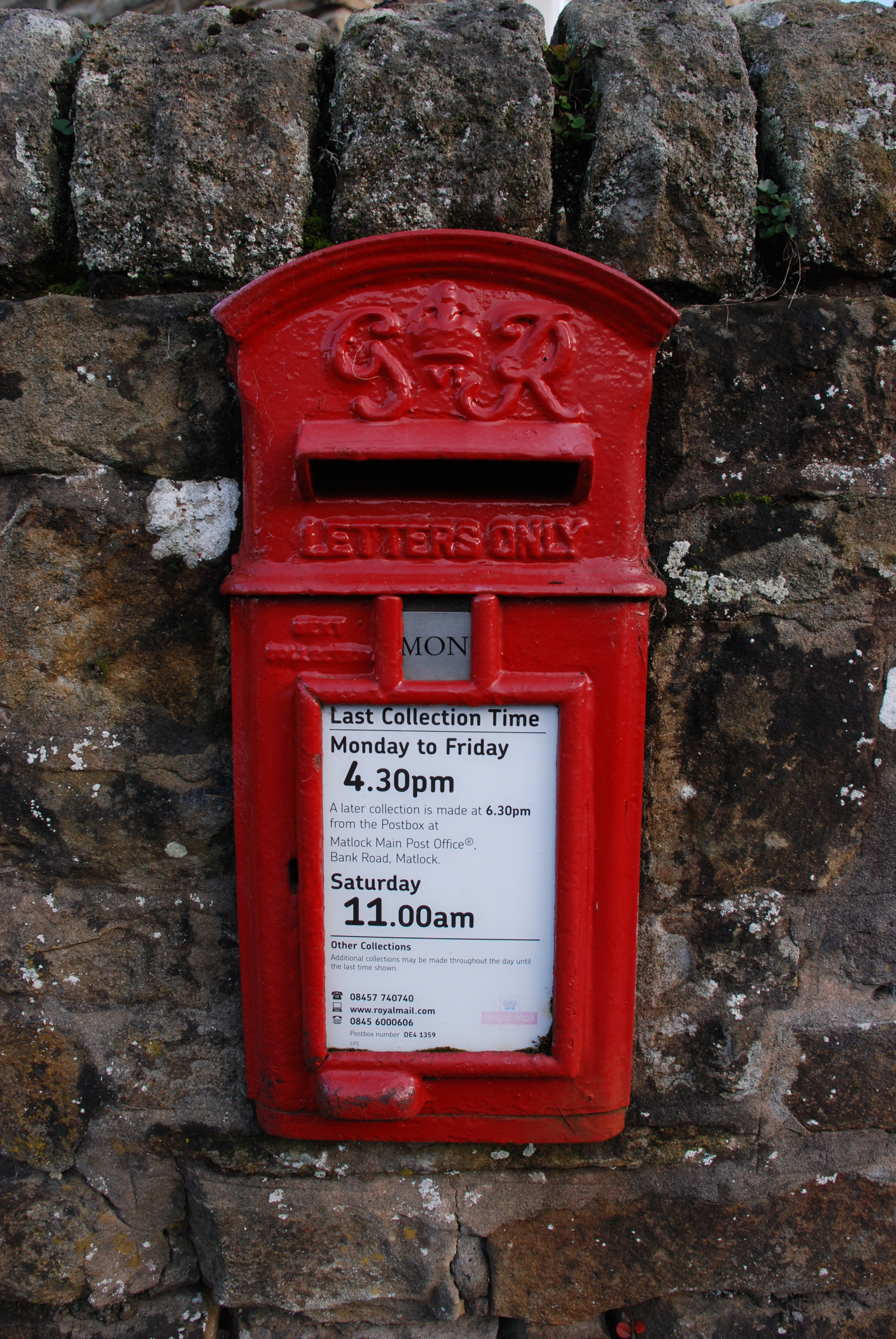
A GVIR Lamp box in a wall near Chatsworth, Derbyshire

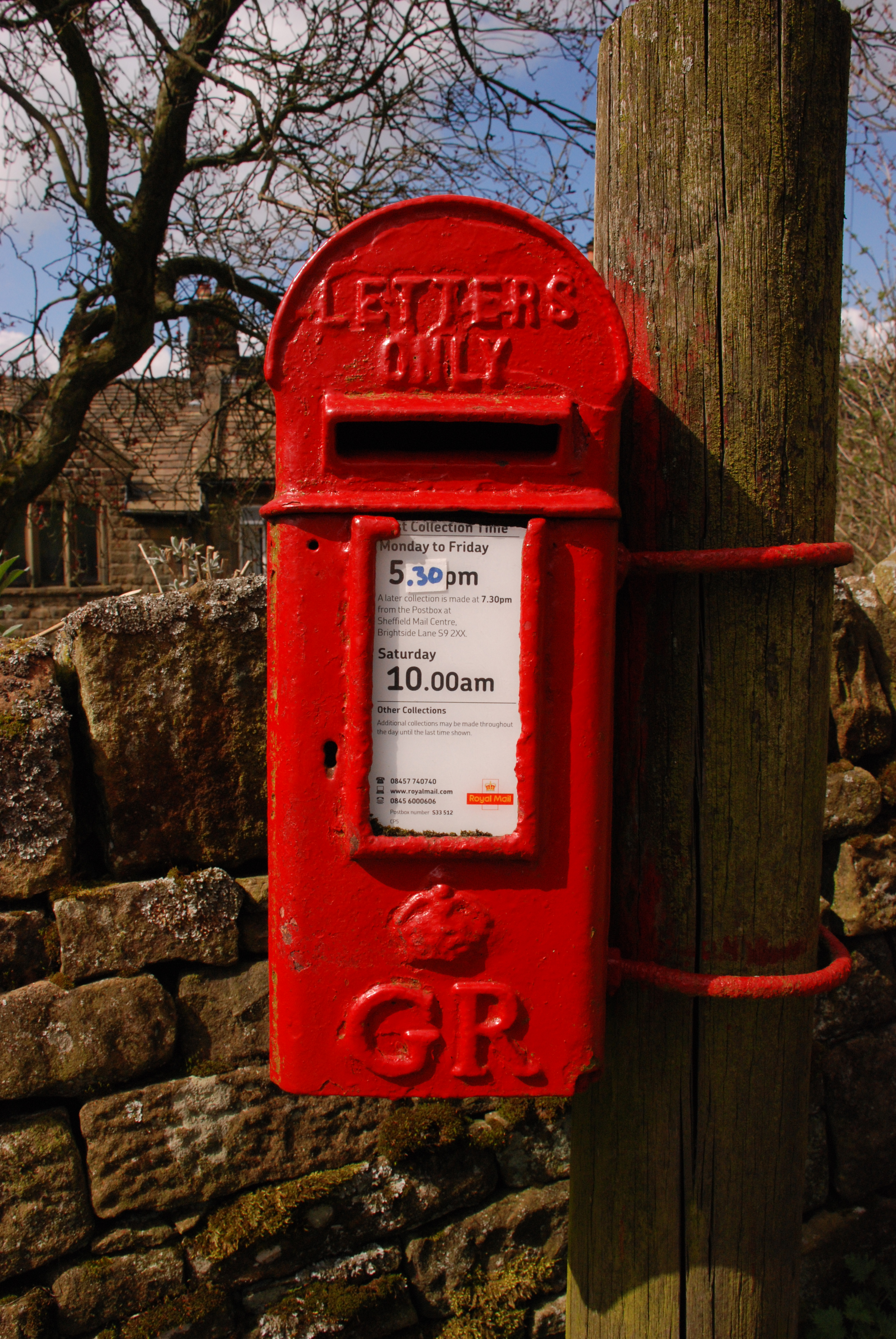
A GR lamp box near Ladybower reservoir, Derbyshire

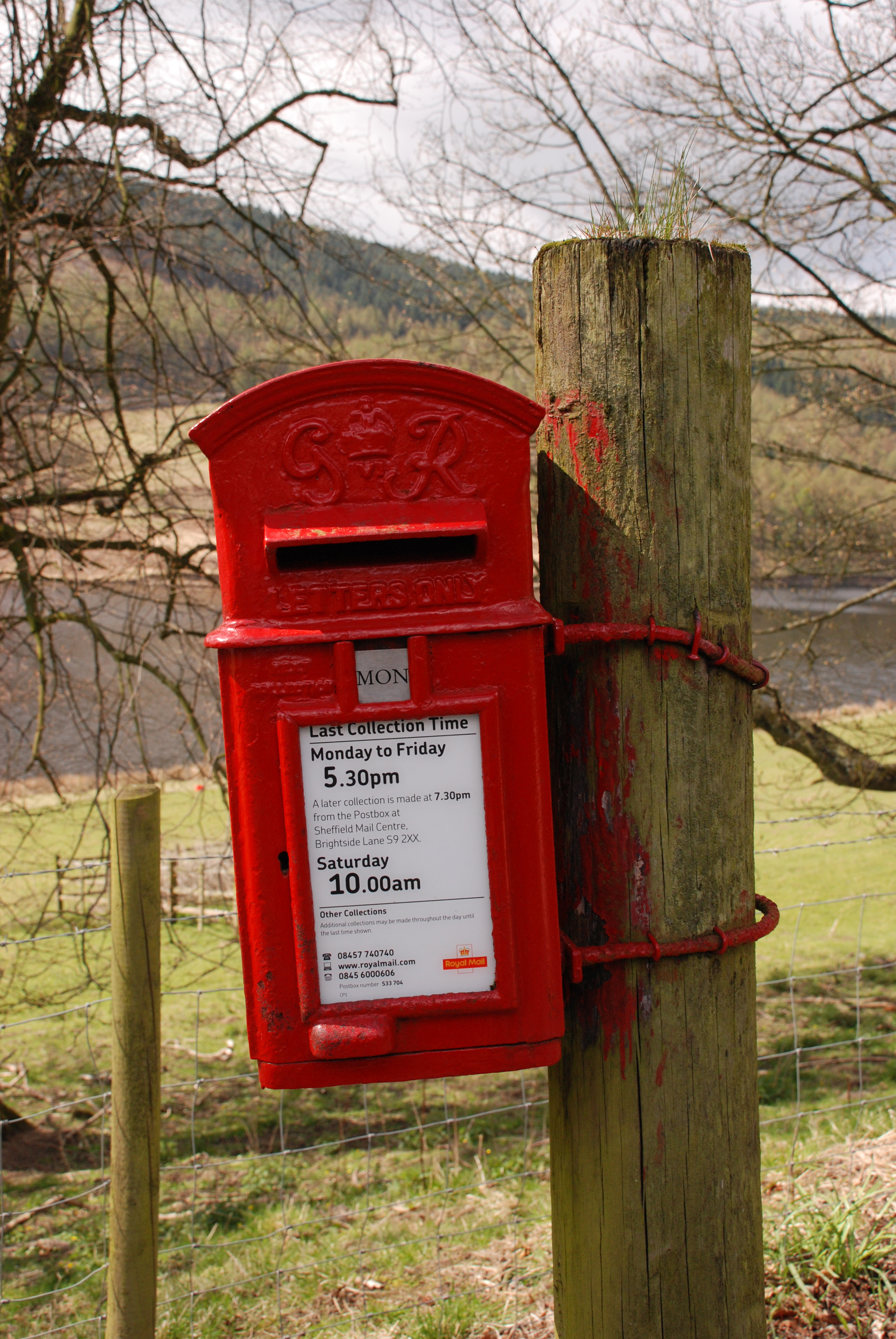
A GVIR lamp box near Ladybower reservoir, Derbyshire

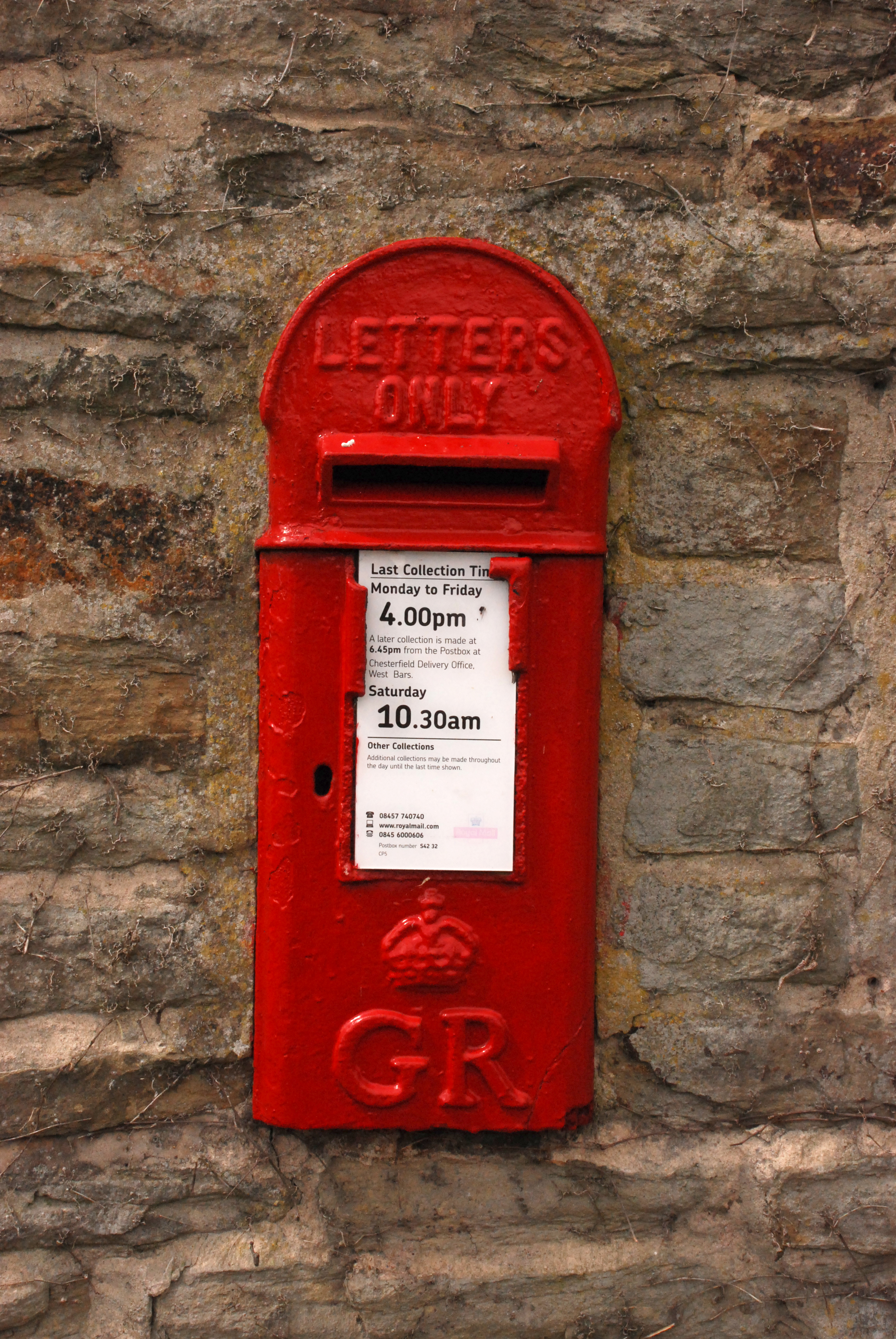
A GR lamp box in a wall at Cutthorpe, Derbyshire

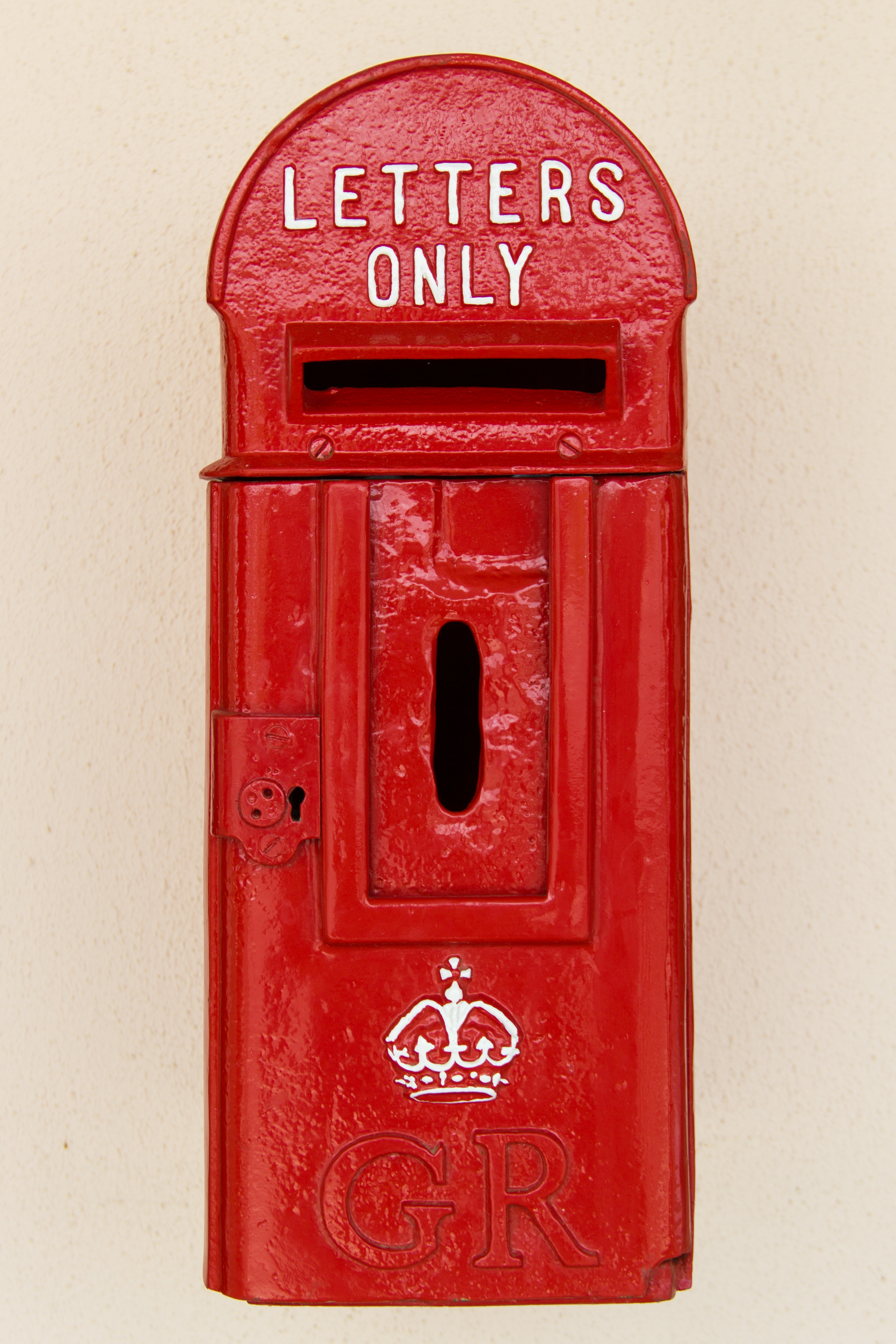
A GR Lamp Box at Cape Agulhas, the most southern post box in Africa

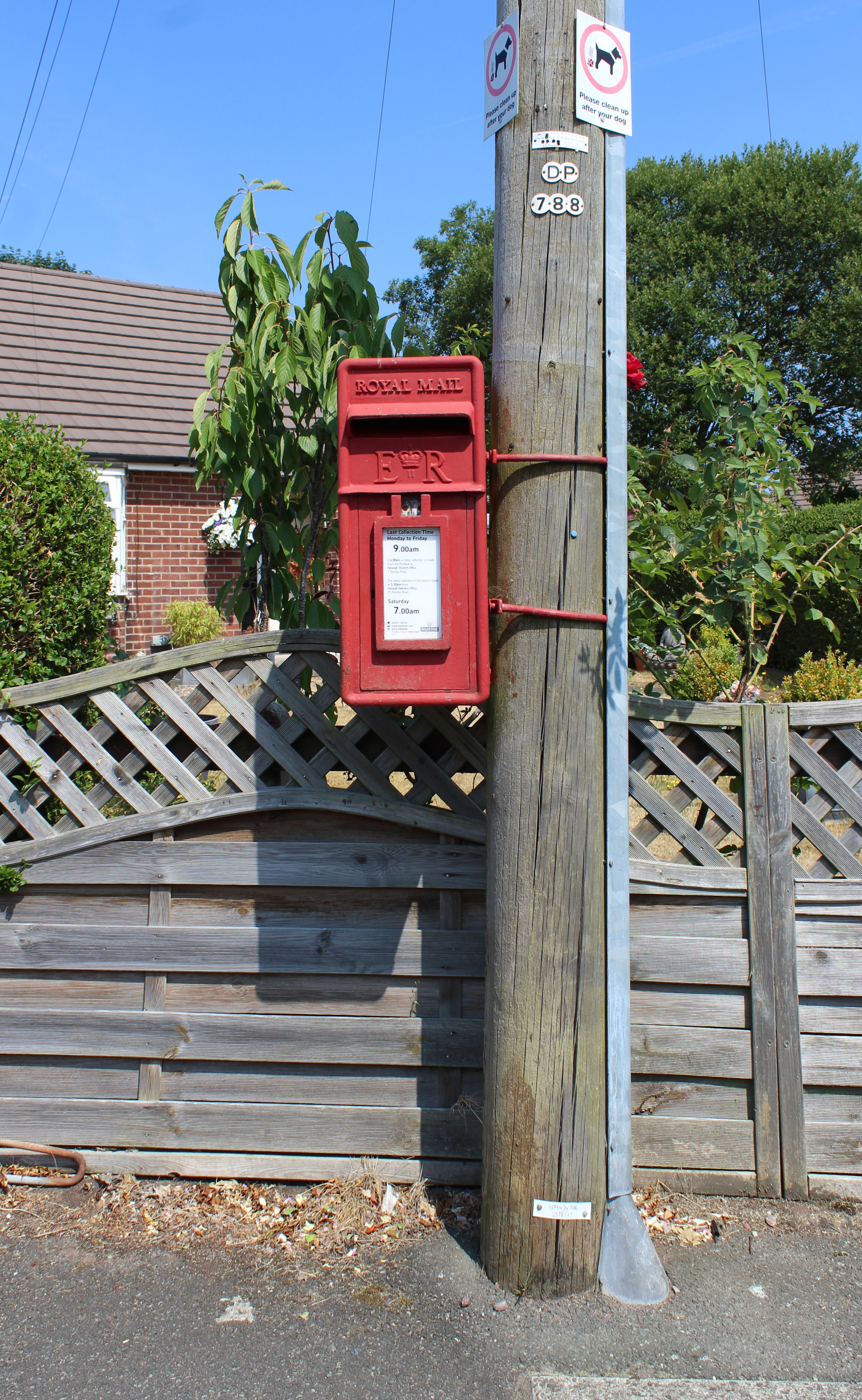
Royal Mail EIIR lamp box attached to a telephone pole

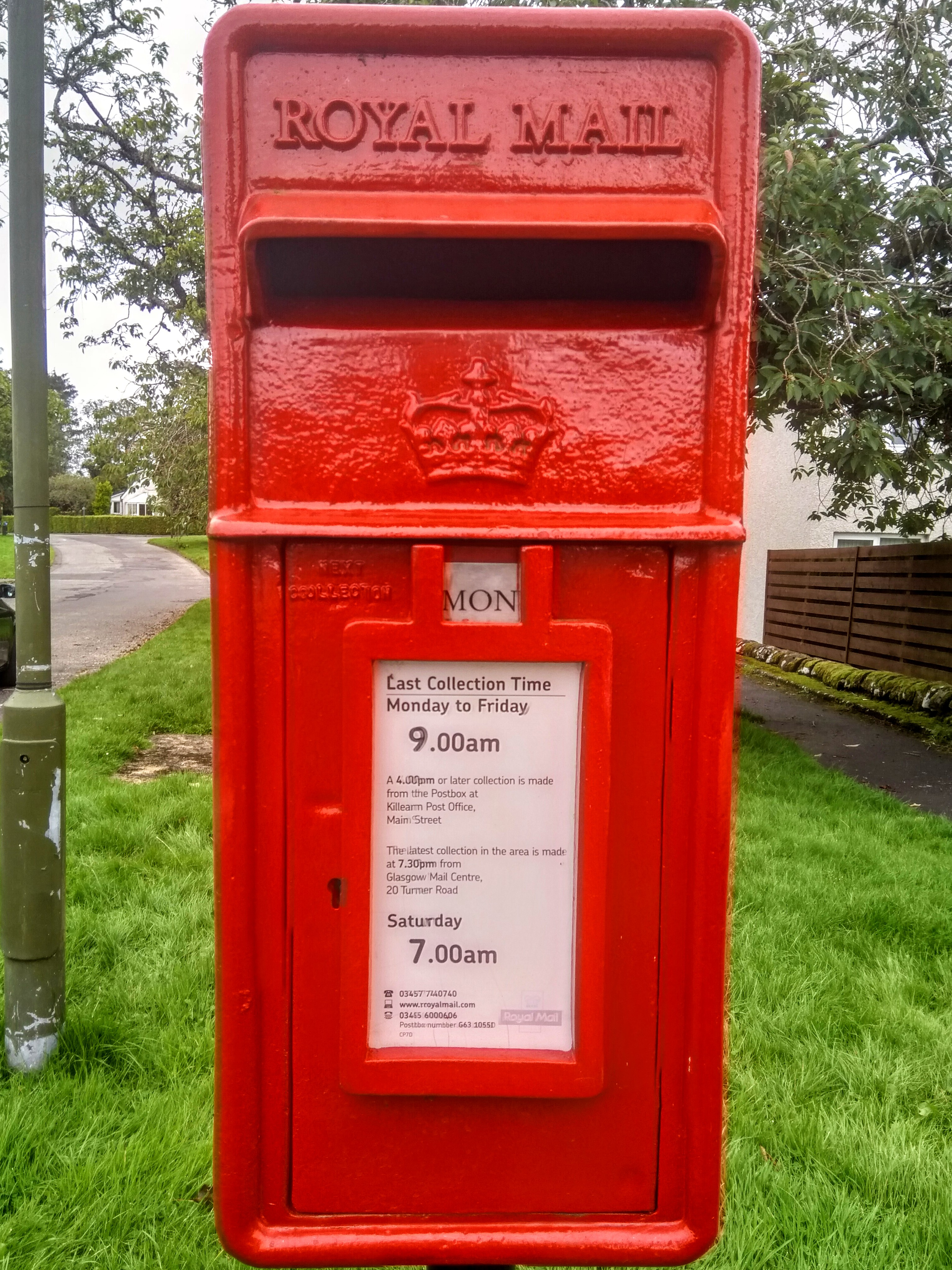
Post mounted Royal Mail lamp box in Killearn, Stirlingshire. In Scotland, the Crown of Scotland appears without the EIIR element of the Cypher

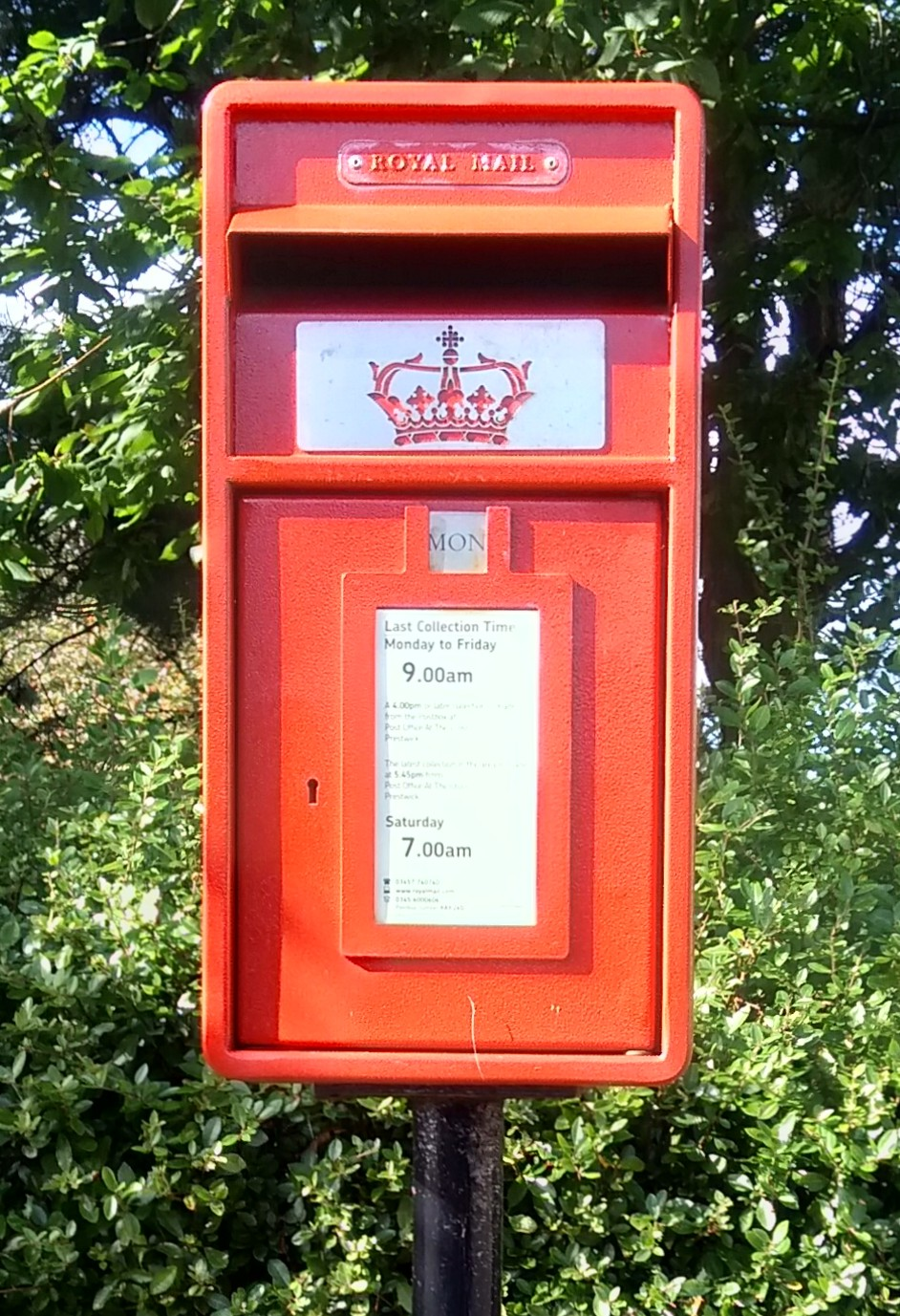
Royal Mail lamp box type LB3426 with the Crown of Scotland on a steel plate. (Prestwick, Scotland)

== See also ==
- Pillar box
- Wall box
- Ludlow style wall box
- 2012 Olympics gold post boxes in the United Kingdom
