= Bankruptcy tourism =

Residents of one country moving to another jurisdiction in order to declare personal bankruptcy there, then returning to their original country of residence, to facilitate bankruptcy in a new jurisdiction where the insolvency laws are deemed to be more favourable, is termed bankruptcy tourism. It is most prevalent in Europe where EU laws allow the free movement of residents to other Eurozone countries. Once in the new jurisdiction a person seeking bankruptcy must establish their Centre of Main Interests there in order to qualify as a resident and become able to petition for bankruptcy.

The issue of bankruptcy tourism has gained notoriety in the Republic of Ireland due to the recession and property crash there resulting in high levels of debt and personal insolvencies. However, the phenomenon first emerged in the UK in 2009 when it was reported that German and Austrian nationals were moving to Kent in order to take advantage of bankruptcy laws in England and Wales, whilst residing close to Eurostar.

Bankruptcy tourism has become associated with the Republic of Ireland, where it has become a high-profile issue with UK-based insolvency solicitor Steve Thatcher, who said in 2012 that he had recently written off €1bn in Irish debt for his Irish clients in the UK. The level of Irish debt being written off in the UK has prompted the government there to seek to have EU law amended in order to make it harder for Irish residents to move to the UK and take advantage of more lenient bankruptcy laws there where bankruptcy lasts for a period of twelve months (but salary instalments can be required for up to three years) as opposed to twelve years in the Republic of Ireland. Thatcher calls this 'bankruptcy emigration' rather than 'bankruptcy tourism', as he says people have to emigrate to the UK in order to go bankrupt, with most of his clients remaining in the UK once their bankruptcy is complete. Ireland later reduced the duration of its insolvency procedures, and since 2016 has a 1-year bankruptcy procedure. However, access to such procedures may still be restricted due to barriers such as the requirement to pay for legal procedures, limited size of the debt, or if one already went through a procedure before. Still, England and Wales have among the shortest and most accessible procedures in the EU, and continue attracting bankruptcy tourism, in particular among over-indebted people with assets.

== Notable Irish bankrupts in the UK ==
The most prominent cases of alleged bankruptcy tourism are perhaps those of David Drumm, former chief executive of Anglo Irish Bank, and property developer John Fleming. Fleming, who had personally guaranteed much of the €1 billion debt of Tivway and associated companies in Ireland, was discharged from bankruptcy in the UK on 10 November 2011, the anniversary of the date on which he was declared bankrupt there.

Other well-known figures who have moved from the Republic of Ireland to the UK in order to go bankrupt include:

- Shane Filan;
- Sean Quinn (bankruptcy petition overturned);
- Ray Grehan;
- Tom McFeeley (bankruptcy petition overturned);
- Ivan Yates; and
- Brian O'Donnell
