= Brian Cregan =

Irish barrister, High Court judge since 2014

The Hon. Mr. Justice Brian Cregan

Judge of the High Court
- Incumbent
- Assumed office 3 April 2014
- Nominated by: Government of Ireland
- Appointed by: Michael D. Higgins

Personal details
- Born: 1961 (age 64–65)
- Education: St John's College, Oxford; King's Inns

Brian Cregan (born 1961) is an Irish judge who has served as a Judge of the High Court since April 2014 and is the current Chairperson of the IBRC commission of investigation.

== Early career ==
Cregan attended Gonzaga College. He attended St John's College, Oxford and the King's Inns. He became a barrister in 1990 and a senior counsel in 2004. His practice focused on competition law and commercial law. He has represented Seán Quinn in the High Court in disputes against Anglo Irish Bank.

== Judicial career ==
=== High Court ===
He was appointed to the High Court in April 2014. Cregan presided over cases in the Commercial Court. He has heard cases involving intellectual property law, procurement law, defamation, insolvency law, and consumer law.

He adjudicated a dispute between Rory McIlroy and his management company Horizon Sports Management in 2015. He was responsible for introducing a three strikes policy for Irish internet service provider UPC Ireland for piracy of copyrighted works by its customers.

=== IBRC Commission ===
Cregan was appointed as chairperson of the IBRC commission of investigation in July 2015, replacing Daniel O'Keeffe. The commission's purpose is to investigate the sale of the company Siteserv by the Irish Bank Resolution Corporation to Denis O'Brien. He delivered the sixth interim report of the Commission in June 2019. Taoiseach Leo Varadkar announced that Cregan's reporting timeframe would continue to 31 March 2020. As of December 2018, the commission had considered 102 statements and dealt with over 500,000 pages of documents.

The final extension for the commission to complete its investigation was for June 2020.

The commission published its final report in May 2023. His role on the commission was full time, meaning that he was not available to hear cases in the High Court during this period.

== Other work ==
In 2013, Cregan published, Parnell: A Novel, a novelised account of the life of Charles Stewart Parnell, which took ten years to research.
