= Anglo Irish Bank hidden loans controversy =

Irish financial scandal

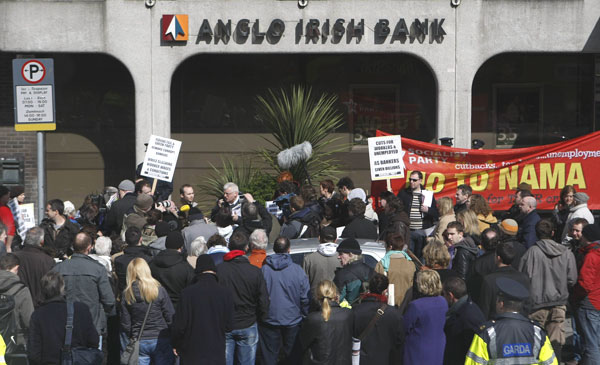
Protestors outside Anglo Irish Bank during protests against the bank bailout in April 2010

The Anglo Irish Bank hidden loans controversy (also known as the circular transactions controversy) began in Dublin in December 2008 when Seán FitzPatrick, the chairman of Anglo Irish Bank (the state's third-largest bank), admitted he had hidden a total of €87 million in loans from the bank, triggering a series of incidents which led to the eventual nationalisation of Anglo on 21 January 2009. FitzPatrick subsequently resigned his position and was followed within twenty-four hours by the bank's non-executive director, Lar Bradshaw and chief executive, David Drumm. A new chairman of Anglo, Donal O'Connor, was quickly appointed from the board, a move welcomed by the Irish Minister for Finance, Brian Lenihan. A number of investigations have been launched into the reasons behind the three resignations. The Central Bank of Ireland is carrying out a review of the bank's dealings, although its Financial Regulator, Patrick Neary, has also since resigned his position. So too did a number of other chairmen, directors and executives involved with Anglo, Irish Life and Permanent and Irish Nationwide.

Within days of the initial admission, an announcement was made that Anglo Irish Bank would be one of three (alongside Allied Irish Bank and Bank of Ireland) that would be recapitalised by the Irish government. The recapitalisation of Anglo Irish Bank was expected to be effected in mid-January 2009, following an Extraordinary General Meeting (EGM). Lenihan instead unexpectedly announced the nationalisation of Anglo Irish Bank the night before the EGM due to difficulties he encountered with the recapitalisation process. Recapitalisations of the other two banks mentioned were expected by the end of March 2009 but, according to Taoiseach Brian Cowen, were expected to be finalised in early February 2009 at a total of €7 billion. The nationalisation of Anglo Irish Bank on 21 January 2009 followed two more resignations earlier that month. On 7 January 2009, another director, Willie McAteer, resigned, becoming the fourth casualty of the controversy. Two days later the Financial Regulator Patrick Neary retired amidst much criticism over his handling of the affair. After the nationalisation, the Chairman of Irish Nationwide, Dr Michael Walsh, resigned on 17 February, one week to the day that government-appointed directors announced they were investigating a deposit of billions of euro by Irish Life and Permanent, placed in Anglo Irish Bank before the end of its financial year.

Taoiseach Brian Cowen denied claims that he was protecting a "Golden Circle" of wealthy financiers from being identified. This mysterious group of ten businessmen is said to have received loans from Anglo Irish Bank in return for buying shares, in a move designed to keep the bank afloat.

== Background ==
Starting in 1986, Seán "Seanie" FitzPatrick spent eighteen years as chief executive of Anglo Irish Bank, during which time the bank grew from a small operator into the third-largest bank in Ireland. When he became the bank's chairman in 2005, handing over the position of chief executive to David Drumm, the bank was recording annual profits of over €500 million. The Anglo share price peaked at €17.60 in May 2007, an increase from under €1 ten years previously. Anglo was valued at nearly €13 billion and FitzPatrick's 4.5 million Anglo shares were worth nearly €80 million at this time. Prior to FitzPatrick's resignation, the Anglo share price had already dropped to €0.32, a drop of 98% with the entire bank valued at a low €242 million and FitzPatrick's stake reduced to €1.5 million.

The Financial Regulator first uncovered the €87 million loans in January 2008 when inspectors from the regulator's offices carried out an inspection into the loan book of rival lender, Irish Nationwide Building Society. The inspectors noticed that a large loan was provided to FitzPatrick at Anglo Irish Bank and later repaid. The Regulator discovered at a later date that similar loans were provided to FitzPatrick in September 2008 and repaid by him in October 2008. When the issue was raised with Anglo Irish Bank it was discovered that there were further loans between the two banks over an extended period of eight years.

It is uncertain which officials, if any, within the bank knew about the loans.

Every Anglo annual report contained a note displaying the total loans given to directors of the bank. This total was measured at a single point in time. In the case of Anglo this occurred on 30 September. FitzPatrick, instead of revealing the true figures of his loans, transferred some of them to the Irish Nationwide Building Society, returning them to Anglo at a later date. He acted in a manner that thwarted the transparency of Anglo's loan book. Financial authorities investigated if there were breaches of corporate governance. The Chief Executive of the Financial Regulator said that "a lay person would expect that issues of this nature and this magnitude would have been picked up" by the external auditors, Ernst & Young. After receiving legal advice Ernst & Young declined to appear before a parliamentary committee.

This in turn led to inaccurate figures for the total directors' loans given for eight consecutive years in the end of year Anglo accounts. 2008 was the first occasion on which FitzPatrick revealed his true figure, that of €87 million or twice the total of the other twelve directors' loan figures.

The Irish Independent described Anglo Irish as Ireland's Enron, and said that FitzPatrick would have already been arrested if this had occurred in the United States.

== Resignations ==
=== Anglo Irish Bank ===
FitzPatrick issued a statement on the evening of 18 December 2008, linking his resignation with a €87 million loan he had from the bank. Ireland's Minister for Finance, Brian Lenihan welcomed the appointment of a new chairman, Donal O'Connor, an official with a substantial commercial track record, saying he "seems a natural choice" for the role. FitzPatrick's resignation came little over two months after he had admitted that his former bank had made mistakes but insisted it had not been "reckless". Alongside FitzPatrick's resignation came that of Bradshaw who had held a loan jointly with FitzPatrick, a loan that was temporarily transferred to another bank prior to a year end audit without the knowledge of Bradshaw. On the evening of 19 December, Drumm announced he would step down with immediate effect, but said he will continue to work with the chairman through a transition phase until a replacement chief executive is agreed upon.

It is appropriate for me to step down today given last evening's announcement in relation to the resignation of Seán FitzPatrick and given the strong statement of support for the Bank and its recapitalisation programme by the Minister for Finance. Good progress is being made on the recapitalisation. It is undoubtedly in the best interests of Anglo that a new Chief Executive is appointed to lead the Bank through its next phase of development. The appointment of Donal O'Connor as Chairman together with a new Chief Executive augurs well for the Bank and all its stakeholders. It gives the Bank fresh impetus and an upward trajectory. I would like to thank all of my colleagues for their intense commitment and honest endeavour and their friendship over the last 15 years.

On 7 January 2009, Willie McAteer resigned his position as finance director and chief risk officer.

On 15 January 2009 the Government of Ireland nationalised Anglo Irish Bank and its shares were suspended on the Dublin and London Stock Exchanges.

On 19 January 2009, the balance of the Board, who had served while FitzPatrick was chairman, resigned. The consequence of Anglo's nationalisation caused steep falls, up to 50%, in the market value of the other two large banks on 19 January 2009.

=== Financial Regulator ===
Following reports of a communication breakdown at the office of the Financial Services Regulatory Authority, the Financial Regulator Patrick Neary on 9 January 2009 announced his decision to retire as of 31 January that year. Neary's weakness in dealing with the issue has received much criticism, with Green Party Senator Dan Boyle calling for a strengthening of powers within the organisation and saying that confidence in Irish financial services had been eroded by events of the previous six months. Financial observers indicated that a replacement for Neary might have to be located in the United States or Britain.

There were also reports that the Financial Regulator may have known of the loans for eight years prior to their revelation. The Fine Gael finance spokesman Richard Bruton called for the board and senior management of the Financial Regulator to be sacked. The Financial Regulator hired a partner from Ernst & Young, to advise on the €440 billion bank guarantee scheme in January 2009, despite the fact that serious questions have been asked about why Ernst & Young did not spot the massive loans that former chief executive Seán FitzPatrick concealed from his shareholders for eight years. Consultants Mazars, which reviewed their operations said "that regulatory expertise was lacking in some areas."

=== Irish Nationwide ===
On the evening of 17 February 2009, the Chairman of the building society Irish Nationwide, Dr Michael Walsh, resigned his position.

=== Irish Stock Exchange ===
On 23 February 2009, the former Anglo Irish Bank director Anne Heraty unexpectedly resigned from the board of the ISEQ. The following morning, Dublin's ISEQ index fell over 3% to stand at 1,987, a 14-year low. The last time it stood under the 2,000 level was the middle of 1995.

=== Dublin Airport Authority ===
On the evening of 24 February 2009, the chairman of the Dublin Airport Authority (DAA), Gary McGann, announced his decision to step down from the board, stating that his decision had been influenced by his former non-executive directorship of Anglo Irish Bank.

== Outcome and nationalisation ==
Anglo Irish Bank has said it would review its policy on directors' loans following FitzPatrick's resignation. The Financial Regulator announced he would be examining the loans issued by Anglo Irish Bank to all its directors, claiming he became aware of the existence of the loans "following an inspection earlier this year". Ultimately he became a victim of the controversy and subsequently announced his retirement.

The Chartered Accountants Regulatory Board (CARB) undertook an investigation into the "circumstances around the issue of inappropriate directors' loans at Anglo Irish" and into the performance of Ernst and Young. The Irish Association of Investment Managers expressed how it was "surprised and disappointed" at the controversy and announced it would be writing to Anglo's new chairman to describe its worries.

The Irish State subsequently announced it was to become the majority shareholder in Anglo Irish Bank by injecting €3 billion into the bank. Opposition party Fine Gael opposed this move and stated on 14 January 2009 that the bank should be shut down but the following evening the Irish government announced that recapitalisation was no longer a serious option and nationalised the bank instead. Lenihan stated that "clear blue water" had been inserted between the old and new versions of Anglo and defended the nationalisation by saying that if the government were to let the bank fail it would be saying to Ireland and other economies that the country was "closed for business". At an Emergency General Meeting held at the Mansion House, Dublin on 16 January 2009, the bank's shareholders angrily voiced their opinions on FitzPatrick's involvement in the bank's downfall and their lack of confidence in the banking sector. The auditors, Ernst & Young were also criticised for failing to detect the loans during their audits. At the EGM the total level of loans to directors was announced as €179 million.

=== Legislation ===
Emergency legislation to nationalise the bank, titled the Anglo Irish Bank Corporation Bill 2009, was voted through Dáil Éireann, being approved by 79 – 67 before passing in Seanad Éireann without a vote on 20 January 2009. During the Seanad's debate on the bill, Senator Shane Ross claimed that "no-one was being told the truth about Anglo Irish Bank" and called the EGM of the previous Friday "a disgrace show[ing] corporate Ireland at its worst, as there were no answers to any questions". Senator Joe O'Toole advocated the chasing of those responsible for the bank's nationalisation "even into the courts", saying that a person could be imprisoned for failure to pay a household bill, yet those who caused the loss of jobs and pensions might not. President Mary McAleese then signed the Anglo Irish Bank Bill at Áras an Uachtaráin the following day.

=== Discussion ===
The bank's internal auditors appeared before the Oireachtas Joint Committee on Economic Regulatory Affairs on 3 February 2009 to discuss the nationalisation of Anglo Irish Bank. The bank's head of internal audit, Walter Tyrrell, told the Oireachtas committee that the movement of loans by Seán FitzPatrick into the bank and back out again could only have been known by FitzPatrick himself and the executive of his account, claiming that loans were tested by means of random sampling and that FitzPatrick's loans had not once been selected – however one loan he held with a partner was chosen. Fine Gael's Kieran O'Donnell expressed his amazement that each of the directors' loans were not tested.

On 11 February 2009, Lenihan revealed plans under which €3.5 billion ($4.5 billion, £3.1 billion) each would be provided by the government's purchase of options intended to re-capitalise Allied Irish Bank and the Bank of Ireland.

== Findings ==
=== Review ===
The Financial Regulator, on the recommendation of the Irish Finance Minister, ordered an "urgent review" of directors' loans at Anglo Irish Bank, saying it has a "very serious view" of the issue. It claimed the loans were "first brought to its attention on December 17th 2008" and that a committee had been established to investigate the matter. Irish Minister for Social and Family Affairs Mary Hanafin said the Financial Regulator had "serious questions" to answer over its supposed lack of knowledge of the loans and the Irish Minister for the Environment, Heritage and Local Government John Gormley asked the Financial Regulator to explain what he termed "extraordinary complacency" in relation to the situation at Anglo Irish Bank. The opposition party Fine Gael's deputy leader and finance representative Richard Bruton quizzed the Minister for Finance on his announcement that he would provide the necessary capital to Anglo Irish Bank.

=== Further Hidden Loans (Deposits) Controversy Involving Irish Life & Permanent ===
On 12 February 2009, details of a further controversial transaction which had the effect of misrepresenting the end-of-year accounts of Anglo-Irish Bank came into the public domain. Anglo-Irish Bank lent €4bn to Irish Life & Permanent (IL&P) for 1 day by way of inter-bank loan, and a subsidiary of Irish Life placed a deposit of a similar amount with Anglo, which was recorded as a customer deposit. Following a discussion with the Minister for Finance, a board meeting of IL&P accepted the resignation of two senior IL&P executives.

=== The "Golden Circle" ===
On 17 February, Taoiseach Brian Cowen informed Dáil Éireann of his knowledge of a group of ten wealthy businessmen who had come together to buy shares in Anglo Irish Bank in 2008 in a transaction which is now at the centre of an investigation by the Office of Corporate Enforcement. Cowen has since denied suggestions put forth by the Opposition that he was attempting to protect anyone involved in this so-called "Golden Circle". The mystery has been discussed in Dáil Éireann since its revelation, with Minister for the Environment, Community and Local Government and Green Party leader John Gormley calling for the names to be made public if a legal way of doing so could be found. Anglo Irish Bank's annual report alongside the PricewaterhouseCoopers report on the bank were both published on 20 February but Tánaiste Mary Coughlan stated beforehand that the ten would not be named in either report. The Anglo report revealed that the bank lent €451 million to the ten "Golden Circle" clients, a 50% increase on previous estimates of €300 million. That same evening, Brian Lenihan also issued a statement containing extracts from the report carried out by PricewaterhouseCoopers for the Financial Regulator. The morning before its publication, Ulick McEvaddy appeared on RTÉ Radio 1 alongside the Socialist Party's Joe Higgins, where he stated that the ten were "heroes" in his opinion (Joe Higgins disagreed). The Sunday Times published the names of four of the Golden Circle members on 22 February. The four members of the elite are Gerry Gannon, Joe O'Reilly, Seamus Ross and Jerry Conlan. The same article declared that Sean Mulryan, Patrick Doherty, Sean Dunne, Derek Quinlan, Denis O'Brien, JP McManus, John Magnier, Noel Smyth, Michael Whelan, Jim Mansfield, Richard Barrett, Johnny Ronan and Fintan Drury were not among the chosen ten. Minister Dick Roche has since stated that the ten cannot be named. On 23 July 2012 the Irish Independent identified the ten members of the golden circle as Belfast-born developer Paddy McKillen, Mennolly Homes's Seamus Ross, auctioneer Brian O'Farrell, John McCabe of McCabe Builders, developer Gerry Maguire, Belfast's Patrick Kearney, Gerry Gannon of Gannon Homes who had a stake in the K Club Ryder Cup golf resort, Kildare businessman Jerry Conlan, Sean Reilly of the McGarrell Reilly firm and developer Joe O'Reilly.

=== Fraud search ===
On 24 February 2009, members of the Garda Bureau of Fraud Investigation executed a District Court warrant at the headquarters of Anglo Irish Bank on St Stephen's Green, Dublin. The warrant, issued the previous day, allowed the Gardaí, acting on behalf of the Office of the Director of Corporate Enforcement, to enter the premises and seize documents that may show crimes committed under section 20 of the Companies' Acts.

== See also ==
- List of Irish companies
- FÁS expenses scandal
- Enten controversy
- Put on the green jersey
