= Bankruptcy Law in the Republic of Ireland =

Law of Ireland

Bankruptcy in Irish Law is a legal process, supervised by the High Court whereby the assets of a personal debtor are realised and distributed amongst his or her creditors in cases where the debtor is unable or unwilling to pay his debts.

Bankruptcy in Ireland applies only to natural persons. Other insolvency processes including liquidation and examinership are used to deal with corporate insolvency.

A bankrupt is somebody who has been adjudicated bankrupt by the High Court. Once a debtor is adjudicated bankrupt, bankruptcy law provides for the mandatory vesting of all of the bankrupt's assets and property in the Official Assignee (OA). Under the supervision of the Court, the OA will realise the bankrupt's assets and distribute the assets according to law among the bankrupt's creditors.

The essence of bankruptcy is that the debtor's assets are transferred to an official who administers and realises them for the benefit of all creditors. The purpose is to release the bankrupt from an unsustainable debt burden and to distribute his assets amongst all creditors equally (although certain types of creditor enjoy priorities). The bankrupt person is subject to restrictions and disabilities on trading and on obtaining credit while a bankrupt but leaves the process with their debts forgiven.

The Official Assignee in bankruptcy can challenge and set aside pre-bankruptcy transactions by the bankrupt to make the assets, the subject of those transactions, available to the creditors.

The classic definition of bankruptcy is that: "it is a law for the benefit and relief of creditors and their debtors, in cases in which the latter are unable or unwilling to pay their debts."

Irish bankruptcy law has been the subject of significant recent comment, from both government sources and the media, as being in need of reform. Part 7 of the Civil Law (Miscellaneous Provisions) Act 2011 has started this process and the government has committed to further reform.

== When bankruptcy arises in Ireland ==
While bankruptcy is commonly considered to arise where a person is insolvent, in Ireland a person can be adjudicated bankrupt where he has committed any act of bankruptcy.

An act of bankruptcy is defined as:

"an act of default, voluntary or involuntary, committed by a debtor, which is either evidence of intent to deprive creditors of their rights through fraudulent assignment or is an implication of insolvency."

=== Acts of bankruptcy ===
The following situations are considered to be acts of bankruptcy pursuant to section 7 of the Bankruptcy Act 1988:

1. where an individual makes a conveyance or assignment of all or substantially all of his property to a trustee(s) for the benefit of his creditors generally;
2. where an individual makes a fraudulent preference —
  this is a transfer of property made in favour of a particular creditor, with a view to giving such a creditor priority over other creditors;
3. where an individual makes a fraudulent disposition —
  this is the transfer of property between persons with the intent to defraud creditors or potential creditors generally;
4. where an individual leaves the state or his dwelling house and stays away with the intent of defeating, delaying or evading his creditors;
5. where an individual files a declaration of insolvency in court;
6. where a creditor presenting a petition, who is due at least €1,900, has served a bankruptcy summons on the debtor and he does not within 14 days after service thereof pay the sum due;
7. if a debtor fails to comply with a debtors summons served pursuant to Section 21(6) of the Bankruptcy (Ireland) Amendment Act 1872.

The most common act of bankruptcy is where a bankruptcy summons has been served on the debtor and he has failed to pay.^{,}

== Objectives of bankruptcy legislation ==
Bankruptcy law is aimed at achieving the following.:

1. securing equality of distribution and to prevent any one creditor obtaining an unfair advantage over the others;
2. protecting bankrupts from vindictive creditors by freeing them from the balance of their debts where they are unable to pay them in full, and to help to rehabilitate them;
3. protecting creditors, not alone from debtors who, prior to bankruptcy, prefer one of more creditors to others, and from the actions of fraudulent bankrupts; and
4. punishing fraudulent debtors.

== Legal effects of bankruptcy ==
When a debtor is adjudicated bankrupt, the most notable effects on his personal situation are as follows:

1. all the debtor's assets and property vest automatically in the OA but see excepted articles below;
2. the bankrupt must disclose to the OA any property acquired after being adjudicated bankrupt;
3. any payment or any transfer of property by the bankrupt to a creditor in preference over other creditors that took place in the 1-year period prior to being adjudicated bankrupt shall be deemed to have been fraudulently done and may be undone or otherwise dealt with by the Court;
4. any sale of property at an under value that the bankrupt carried out in the one-year period prior to being adjudicated bankrupt may be avoided and undone by the OA;
5. any person who is known or suspected to have in his possession or control any property of the bankrupt or to have disposed of any property of the bankrupt or who is supposed to have indebtedness to the bankrupt or any person who is capable of giving information relating to the trade, dealings, affairs or property of the bankrupt may be summonsed by a Court;
6. the bankrupt's salary is likely to be attached in favour of the OA;
7. the Court may make such allowances as the Court thinks proper, in any special circumstances brought to its attention, to the bankrupt out of his or her estate;
8. certain of the bankrupt's post may be re-directed to the OA;
9. it is an offence for the bankrupt to act as an officer of or directly or indirectly take part or be concerned in the promotion, formation or management of any Irish company or of any foreign company which has an established place of business in Ireland;
10. the bankrupt cannot obtain credit over €650 without disclosing his status as a bankrupt;
11. the bankrupt is restricted from participation in a range of bodies set up by statute;
12. after five years the bankrupt may be discharged;
13. after twelve years the bankrupt will be discharged; and
14. the Revenue Commissioners are obliged to provide information on request to the Official Assignee.
15. until the Electoral (Amendment) Act 2014, undischarged bankrupts were not eligible to stand in elections other than local elections.

The bankrupt commits a criminal offence if he does not disclose all his property to the Court or conceals any part of his estate or if he obtains by false representation any property or credit.

Offences carry the penalty on summary conviction of a fine not exceeding €634.87 or up to 12 months prison or both and on indictment of a fine not exceeding €1,269.74 or up to 5 years prison or both.

=== Excepted articles ===
Pursuant to S45 of the Bankruptcy Act (as amended), a bankrupt is permitted to retain as excepted articles: clothing, furniture, bedding, tools or equipment of his trade or occupation or necessary items for himself, his/her spouse or civil partner, children and dependent relatives residing with him/her, as he may select, not exceeding in value €3,100 or such further amount as the court on an application by the bankrupt may allow.

If, having selected items up to the specified value, the bankrupt requests the official assignee not to dispose of items of the kind set out above, the OA may not dispose of such items other than in accordance with an order of the court.

On an application by the OA or by the bankrupt under this section the court may postpone the removal and sale; permit the bankrupt to retain the items or order the sale of the items at any time.

== Suspension of enforcement ==
Once a bankruptcy petition issues, all uncompleted legal enforcement against the debtor is stopped. This is to preserve equality among creditors as no enforcement action can be taken against a bankrupt.

The proceeds of execution of a Court order must be retained by the Sheriff for 21 days. If a bankruptcy commences in this period, the proceeds are sent to the official assignee rather than the creditors. If the process has not been completed, then bankruptcy will freeze enforcement and the assets collected by the sheriff must be turned over to the bankruptcy trustee or OA.

The OA can apply to have proceedings stopped or restrained. Legal proceedings will generally be stopped on such terms as the court deems appropriate.

On adjudication of bankruptcy, creditors may not take action against the bankrupt's person or property without Court consent.

However, a secured creditor can realise its security separately from the bankruptcy.

== Initiating the bankruptcy process ==
=== Creditor's petition ===
A creditor is entitled to present a petition for adjudication against a debtor, without having to give notice to the debtor, if:

1. the debt owing by the debtor to the petitioning creditor amounts to €1,900 or more;
2. the debt is a liquidated sum (a sum certain);
3. the act of bankruptcy on which the petition is founded has occurred within three months before the presentation of the petition; and
4. the debtor is domiciled in the state or, within three years before the date of the presentation of the petition, has ordinarily resided or had a dwelling house or place of business in the state or has carried on business in the state personally or by means of an agent or manager, or is, or within the said period has been, a member of a partnership which has carried on business in the state by means of a partner, agent or manager.

Service of the petition is effected by serving a copy of the petition on the debtor and showing him the original.

The following additional steps are required prior to presenting a petition:

1. prior to the issue of a bankruptcy summons, "Particulars of the Demand and Notice Requiring Payment" must be sent to the debtor by way of ordinary post, the debtor has 4 clear days to respond;
2. should the debtor fail to respond, the creditor can then proceed to have a bankruptcy summons issued with 2 copies of the notice together with an affidavit for bankruptcy summons sworn by the creditor being filed in the Examiner's Office together with €650 for the OA's initial costs, fees and expenses;
3. once the bankruptcy summons is issued it should be personally served on the debtor together with the affidavit within 28 days. The summons server must endorse the summons with the date of service within 3 days of having served it;
4. the debtor has 14 days after the service of summons within which to pay the sum or apply to court to have the summons dismissed; and
5. if the debtor fails to pay the debt or to apply to have the summons dismissed with the 14 days, he will be deemed to have committed an act of bankruptcy.

==== Hearing the petition ====
If the court is satisfied that all the relevant requirements have been complied with, it will adjudicate the debtor bankrupt. A duplicate copy of this order is given to the bankruptcy inspector who serves it on the debtor. The bankruptcy inspector is a civil servant employed in the office of the OA.

The bankrupt can appeal the order but if there is no appeal then the adjudication is published in Iris Oifigiúil and a newspaper as directed by the court and a statutory sitting is held within 3 weeks of the publication. The bankrupt must make a full disclosure of all his property to the court at this hearing.

Part 5 of the Bankruptcy Act 1988 makes provision for an application at the statutory sitting for the appointment of a trustee who will carry out the functions normally carried out by the OA in winding up the a bankrupt's estate. These provisions have rarely been invoked.

=== Debtor's petition ===
Before a debtor may bring bankruptcy proceedings against himself, he must show that he is unable to pay his debts to his creditors and that his available estate is sufficient to produce at least €1,900.00.

Petitions by debtors are relatively rare in Ireland. The most high profile debtor's petition in recent times was that of Seán FitzPatrick, former chairman of Anglo Irish Bank in July 2010.

== Duties of the bankrupt to the official assignee ==
The bankrupt is obliged (pursuant to section 19 of the Bankruptcy Act 1998) to:

1. unless the court otherwise directs, forthwith deliver such books of account or other papers relating to his estate in his possession or control as the Official Assignee may from time to time request and disclose to him such of them as are in the possession or control of any other person;
2. deliver up possession of any part of his property which is divisible among his creditors under this Act, and which is for the time being in his possession or control;
3. unless the Court otherwise directs, within the prescribed time file in the Central Office of the High Court a statement of affairs in the prescribed form and deliver a copy thereof to the OA;
4. give every reasonable assistance in the administration of the estate; and
5. disclose any property acquired after his adjudication in bankruptcy.

== Appointment of an official assignee in bankruptcy ==
Prior to 1999, the OA was appointed by the Minister for Justice. The Court Services Act 1998 amended this procedure to allow the chief executive officer of the Courts Service to appoint the OA in the place of the Minister for Justice. In 2013, the OA and the Office of the OA were removed from the staff of Courts Service. The OA relies on section 12 of the Personal Insolvency Act 2012 as the basis of his appointment. The issue of whether this arrangement is constitutional has been a subject of controversy before the Irish High Court.

The functions of the OA are to get in and realise the property, to ascertain the debts and liabilities and to distribute the assets.

In the performance of his functions the OA shall, in particular, have powers to:

1. sell the property by public auction or private contract, with power to transfer the whole thereof to any person or to sell the same in lots;
2. make any compromise or arrangement with creditors or persons claiming to be creditors or having or alleging themselves to have any claim present or future, certain or contingent, ascertained or sounding only in damages whereby the bankrupt or arranging debtor may be rendered liable;
3. compromise all debts and liabilities capable of resulting in debts and all claims, present or future, certain or contingent, ascertained or sounding only in damages, subsisting or supposed to subsist between the bankrupt or arranging debtor and any debtor and all questions in any way relating to or affecting the assets or the proceedings on such terms as may be agreed and take any security for the discharge of any debt, liability or claim, and give a complete discharge in respect thereof;
4. institute, continue or defend any proceedings relating to the bankrupt's property,
5. refer any dispute concerning the property to arbitration under the terms of section 11 of the Arbitration Act, 1954;
6. mortgage or pledge any property to raise any money required for the proper administration of the bankruptcy without the sanction of the court;
7. take out in his official name without being required to give security, letters of administration to any estate on the administration of which the bankrupt or arranging debtor would benefit;
8. agree a sum for costs where the court so directs or where he considers that the amount which would be allowed on taxation would not exceed €12,000.00;
9. agree the charges of accountants, auctioneers, brokers and other persons;
10. ascertain and certify to the court the amount due in respect of a mortgage debt and the due priority thereof with power to the Court to vary such certificate.

== Bankruptcy and the family home ==
Pursuant to section 61 of the Bankruptcy Act 1988 all of the bankrupt's assets vest in the OA. This includes the bankrupt's interest in the family home. However the OA must apply to court under section 61(5)to permit him to sell a family home. The court has a discretion to postpone a sale under this section "having regard to the interests of the creditors and of the spouse and dependents of the bankrupt as well as the circumstances of the case".

In most circumstances the spouse of the bankrupt will assert an interest in the family home. Notwithstanding this interest the court may make an order under section 31 of the Land and Conveyancing Law Reform Act 2009 for partition of land or for sale of the land and distribution of the proceeds as the court directs. Accordingly, the OA may obtain an order for sale subject to distributing a share of the proceeds to the spouse of the bankrupt.

The mechanisms by which a spouse's interest in the family home arise are complex and careful consideration needs to be given to the existence and percentage of such interest in the circumstances of any given case.

If a spouse is engaging in behaviour which may lead to the loss of any interest in the family home, with the intention to deprive a spouse of dependent child of such an interest, it is open to the other spouse to apply to court for an order under section 5 of the Family Home Protection Act 1976 to protect such an interest.

== Centre of main interests ==
COMI is a concept introduced by the EU Insolvency Regulation which states that a person's COMI "should correspond to the place where the debtor conducts the administration of his interests on a regular basis and is therefore ascertainable by third parties".

The essential elements of the COMI principles are set out below.

- COMI for an individual is where he conducts the administration of his interests on a regular basis and is ascertainable by third parties.
- It can be the professional centre of business rather than the habitual residence.
- COMI can be moved but there needs to be an element of permanence to the move.
- Even if COMI is in one member state, insolvency proceedings against an individual can be opened in another member state but they will be either territorial or secondary proceedings and will be limited to the assets in that jurisdiction.
- Where either main, territorial or secondary proceedings are opened, the law governing the opening, closure and conduct of each of those proceedings will be the law of the member state which has opened those proceedings.
- It may be possible to persuade a court not to open secondary proceedings after main proceedings are opened elsewhere, if it can be demonstrated that no useful purpose can be served by those proceedings and that they may simply multiply costs.
- The beneficiaries of detrimental acts can avoid the application of the law of the member state which opened the insolvency proceedings if they can show that the law they thought governed the transaction at the time they entered into the transaction upholds the circumstances of the transaction.
- Security rights and other rights effectively relating to real property are essentially governed by the law of the country where the property is located.
- Where an individual has an Irish COMI, then the bankruptcy proceedings are main proceedings for the purposes of the Insolvency Regulation and have general effects throughout the EU excluding Denmark.

In a significant judgment on 10 January 2012 the High Court in Belfast held that Sean Quinn who had interests on both sides of the border did not have his COMI in Northern Ireland. Accordingly, he now faces a bankruptcy petition in the Republic of Ireland.

== Secured creditors and bankruptcy ==
A secured creditor has 3 options available to it where the individual who granted the security is adjudged bankrupt.

1. Realise the secured asset and, if necessary, lodge a proof of debt for the balance due once the proceeds of the sale have been deducted from the debt due;
2. Surrender the security held and lodge a proof of debt for the entire amount due; or
3. Retain the security, value it and lodge a proof of debt for the difference between the estimated value and the debt due to it

== Discharge and termination of bankruptcy ==
There are 3 ways to terminate bankruptcy.

=== Discharge/release ===
Discharge frees the debtor from all pre-bankruptcy liabilities.

A bankruptcy is automatically discharged after 12 years. This is a provision introduced in 2011 and historically there was no automatic discharge.

Obtaining a discharge earlier than 12 years requires an application to court.

A court will order a discharge/release where:

- provision has been made to cover the costs. fees (of the OA) and expenses of the bankruptcy, the preferential creditors, and
  - all other creditors have been paid in full, including any interest allowed by the court;
  - the bankrupt has obtain the consent in writing of all creditors whose debts have been admitted and proved; or
  - the bankrupt enters a composition or arrangement with creditors which has been successfully carried out;
- the court is satisfied that the estate of the bankrupt has been fully realised, provision has been made to cover the costs, fees (of the OA) and expenses of the bankruptcy, the preferential creditors, and
  - the creditors have been paid at least 50%;
- the bankruptcy has been in place for 5 years (prior to 2011 this was 12 years), provision has been made to cover the costs. fees (of the OA) and expenses of the bankruptcy, the preferential creditors;
  - the court is satisfied that all after acquired property was disclosed; and
  - the court is satisfied that it is reasonable and proper to grant discharge.

=== Annulment ===
Annulment involves cancellation of the bankruptcy and supposes that the bankruptcy was granted in error.

There are basically two grounds for annulment.

The first applies in any case where in the opinion of the court, the debtor ought not to have been adjudicated bankrupt
i.e. where the order was made without jurisdiction or where there had been a clear abuse of process; where the mechanisms of the Bankruptcy Act had been improperly used.

The second applies where the bankrupt within 3 days or such extended time not exceeding 14 days as the Court thinks fit from the service of the copy of the order of adjudication on him, show cause to the Court against the validity of the adjudication. This involves the bankrupt showing that the creditor(s) have not complied with any of the Creditor's Petition requirements.

==== Order for annulment ====
Only the bankrupt can apply to have the bankruptcy annulled. Such an order can be made at any stage during the proceedings. The effect of an order is to put the bankrupt in the position he was in prior to adjudication insofar as that is possible without causing prejudice to the creditors.

=== Recission ===
The Court may review, rescind or vary an order made by it in the course of a bankruptcy matter other than an order of discharge or annulment.

The Court can rescind an adjudication of bankruptcy where:

- there is a relevant change in the circumstances, or
- new evidence comes to light which could not have been cited on an appeal.

== Arrangements ==
An arrangement is an agreement between the debtor and his creditors. An arrangement allows a debtor to:

- settle outstanding debts by paying a proportion of the amount that he owed to his creditors; and
- come to an arrangement with his creditors over the payment of his debts

=== Voluntary arrangements ===
An individual may try to come to a voluntary arrangement by deed with his creditors outside the control of the court with a view to agreeing a part-payment of his debts in settlement of the claims. This arrangement does not require court approval and avoids a bankruptcy.

Reasons for considering this option include:

- these proceedings are more expedient as bankruptcy proceedings tend to take a long time;
- the cost involved are usually less;
- the debtor avoids the publicity of bankruptcy proceedings;
- the debtor retains more control over the process; and
- the debtor may continue to trade.

Any arrangement made between the debtor and creditor out of court is a matter of contract between them with there being no involvement by the bankruptcy jurisdiction of the High Court. A deed of arrangement must be registered with the High Court offices. Failure to register within seven days, will make it void.

==== Effect of the arrangement on the creditor ====
The agreement is binding on the participating creditor regardless of whether the other creditors have assented to the offer or not.

=== Arrangements under court control ===
The requirements for a debtor to come to an arrangement with his creditors which is under the control of the court are as follows:

- full provision must be made, by way of a supporting affidavit giving particulars of and description of assets and their fair value and an estimate for fees, expenses and the amount due to preferential creditors;
- once 60% of the creditors in value and number have accepted the proposal and it is approved by the court, it becomes binding on all the creditors, who were creditors at the time of the petition and had notice of the sitting;
- only creditors who have debts of at least €30 will be entitled to vote at such a sitting,
- the advantages are similar to those of a voluntary arrangement with the added significant advantage that dissenting creditors can be bound if the requisite majority is obtained; however, there will be additional court costs and expenses of the OA. Additionally, should a composition be voted down, bankruptcy proceedings will undoubtedly follow so using voluntary arrangements under court control is a high risk strategy for a debtor.

The role of the OA is to present to the Court for approval:

- a list of creditors admitted by him or by the court;
- a copy of the relevant account of the arranging debtor;
- particulars of expenses, fees, costs, preferential payments, dividend payable to creditors; and
- his report on the realisation of the estate.

The court may make such order as it thinks fit for the distribution of the estate or any part thereof by payment of the expenses, fees, costs and preferential payments as well as the relevant dividend.

The court's grounds for refusal of consent for such an arrangement are broad. The court can refuse consent if:

- the proposals are unfair on the opposing minority;
- the debtor's conduct had been commercially unfair; or
- it is not a bona-fide arrangement

and may refuse to approve on certain other grounds.

== Post-Bankruptcy arrangements ==
It is also possible to have an arrangement with creditors after bankruptcy commences. This is known as a composition in bankruptcy. It commences with an application to court which if granted, suspends bankruptcy proceedings.

The features of a post-bankruptcy arrangement are as follows:

- a meeting is called before the court for the purpose of making an offer to creditors. The meeting must be advertised and certain statements must be filed;
- the arrangement requires consent of 60% in value and 60% in number of creditors and court approval. The court summons meetings, under the auspices of a court official, the Examiner;
- a composition can be paid by payment of cash within a certain time, payment in instalments or cash payment and instalments.

The bankruptcy may be discharged when:

- in the case of a composition payable in cash, upon lodgement with the OA of the necessary amount to pay the composition, expenses, fees, costs, such further sums as the court may direct and the preferential payments;
- in the case of a composition payable by instalments which are secured to the satisfaction of the creditors, upon lodgement with the OA of the completed securities, the necessary amount to pay expenses, fees, costs, such further sums as the court may direct and the preferential payments;
- in the case of a composition payable partly in cash and partly by instalments which are secured to the satisfaction of the creditors, upon lodgement with the OA of the completed securities, the necessary amount to pay the cash composition, expenses, fees, costs, such further sums as the court may direct and the preferential payments.

== Statistics ==
Bankruptcy is, at present, relatively rarely used in Ireland. This can be partly explained by the prevalence of Bankruptcy tourism which allows people to avail of less stringent bankruptcy laws outside Ireland.

Bankruptcy statistics
| Year | Total adjudications |
|---|---|
| 2010 | 29 |
| 2011 | 33 |
| 2012 | 35 |

== Recent reform and further proposals ==
Irish Bankruptcy laws have been the subject of sustained criticism both regarding the complexity of the process and the minimum length of time (12 years, until amended in 2011) taken to purge bankruptcy where all of the debts of the bankrupt have not been discharged.

In the wake of the bursting of the Irish property bubble, commentators have noted the appearance of bankruptcy tourism where Irish debtors move to other jurisdictions to avail of more lenient bankruptcy laws. The most prominent cases of alleged bankruptcy tourism are perhaps those of David Drumm former chief executive of Anglo Irish Bank and property developer John Fleming. Fleming, who had personally guaranteed much of the €1 billion debt of Tivway and associated companies in Ireland, was discharged from bankruptcy in the UK on 10 November 2011, the anniversary of the date on which he was declared bankrupt there. Former government minister Ivan Yates, who has described the Irish bankruptcy regime as "purgatory", has publicly announced that he is contemplating moving to the UK to avail of its bankruptcy regime. One UK-based insolvency solicitor, Steve Thatcher, claimed in 2012 that he had recently written off €1bn in Irish debt for his Irish clients in the UK in only eighteen months. The high level of Irish debt being written off in the UK has prompted the government there to seek to have EU law amended to make it harder for Irish residents to move to the UK and take advantage of more lenient bankruptcy laws there[3] where bankruptcy lasts for a period of twelve months as opposed to twelve years in the Bankruptcy in Ireland. Though Thatcher dismisses the validity of the term 'bankruptcy tourism' and instead calls it 'bankruptcy emigration' as he says people have to emigrate to the UK to go bankrupt, with the majority of his clients remaining in the UK once their bankruptcy is complete.

The Law Reform Commission published an interim report on Personal Debt Management and Debt Enforcement (LRC 96-2010). From the perspective of bankruptcy law the main recommendations of this report include an automatic discharge from bankruptcy after 3 years (subject to debtor's assets remaining in the bankruptcy and the Official Assignee being permitted to require the bankrupt to make payments for up to 5 years), an increase in the level of debt required to bring a creditor's petition to €50,000 and a reduction in the range of priority debts in bankruptcy.

The government committed to reform personal insolvency law in a memorandum of understanding with the EU and the International Monetary Fund. Commentators have expressed the view that there is a risk that this will not be completed on the agreed timetable. The government has stated that it intends to publish a bill in this regard by Easter 2012.

Part 7 of the Civil Law (Miscellaneous Provisions) Act 2011 while not going as far as proposed in the Law Reform Commission Report, has made substantial amendments to the Bankruptcy Act 1988 including:

- bankruptcy will be automatically discharged after 12 years (it is estimated that this has terminated more than 300 legacy bankruptcies);
- the minimum period before a bankrupt can seek a discharge from bankruptcy, where the debts have not been paid in full, is decreased from 12 to 5 years;
- it provides for a petition be presented where a person ordinarily resided in the state or carried on business in the state in the period of three years prior to the date of its presentation (rather than the current period of one year);
- it allows the Revenue Commissioners to furnish information to the Official Assignee or a trustee in bankruptcy; and
- It increases the period of time before adjudication in which dispositions may be deemed fraudulent or may be set aside to one year.

=== New Personal Insolvency Act ===
On 24 January 2012 the Department of Justice and Equality published the Draft General Scheme of a new personal insolvency bill. The proposed bill would, among other things, reduce the period of bankruptcy to 3 years and introduce three different non-judicial mechanisms to deal with debt. The full bill was expected to be published by the end of April 2012.

On 29 June 2012 the Irish Government published the text of the bill. The bill provides for, amongst other things:

- three new non-judicial debt resolution mechanisms to deal with personal insolvency:
  - Debt Relief Notices
  - Debt Settlement Arrangements
  - Personal Insolvency Arrangements; and
- significant amendments to the Bankruptcy Act 1988 including:
  - shortening the period of bankruptcy to three years (extensible to eight on application to court based on non-co-operation or concealment of assets;
  - raising the threshold of debt for bankruptcy to €20,000;
  - making the costs of a petitioner at the discretion of the court, having considered any unreasonable refusal by the petitioner to accept a proposal that the debtor enter into one of the non-judicial personal insolvency arrangements;
  - repealing the provisions relating to court supervised schemes of arrangement; and
  - extending the period in respect of which pre-adjudication fraudulent or under-value transactions will be void.

The Personal Insolvency Act 2012 was signed by the president on 26 December 2012 and the Minister indicated that he expects licensing of personal insolvency practitioners to take place in April/May 2012 but did not indicate when he expected the first debtors would utilise the new insolvency mechanisms.

== Sources ==
- Irish Statute Book:
  - Deeds of Arrangement Act, 1887
  - Bankruptcy Act, 1988
  - Personal Insolvency Act 2012
