= David Drumm =

Irish banking executive

David Kenneth Drumm (born November 1966) is an Irish banking executive. He was the CEO of Anglo Irish Bank from 2005 to 2008. In 2018, he was convicted of fraud for actions during his time there related to the Anglo Irish Bank hidden loans controversy.

== Early life ==
Drumm was born in November 1966, in the seaside town of Skerries, County Dublin.

== Career ==
He joined McQuillan Kelly & Company from school to train as a chartered accountant.

In 1988 he moved to the venture capital wing of the International Fund for Ireland, from which he obtained a position of assistant manager with Anglo Irish Bank. In 1997 Drumm was a senior lender in the bank. After another lender who managed a portfolio of US loans declined the opportunity to move there, Drumm accepted. He moved his young family to Boston in April 1998, with a brief to analyse the potential for Anglo-Irish Bank to expand its US business. He built up relationships with US investors and developers, as well as local banks before reporting back favourably to Dublin. The board of Anglo approved entry to the market, and Drumm led the expansion of its US office. It received a banking licence from the Reserve Bank of Boston in April 1999, built partnerships with local banks, rented offices and hired local staff. The efforts culminated in Anglo financing the headquarters of New Balance, a well known shoe-maker. By the time Drumm returned to Ireland in 2003, Anglo's US loan book had grown to $1billion and his efforts to establish the new office were considered a success back in Dublin.

After rising through the ranks, he was made Chief Executive from 2005. Drumm resigned his position following the resignation of chairman Seán FitzPatrick in December 2008, amid mounting revelations over hidden loans.

=== Post Anglo-Irish ===
Drumm subsequently moved with his family to Massachusetts, US, where in 2010 he filed for bankruptcy under US law. The hearing at the Boston-based court heard from the Irish Bank Resolution Corporation, which fought Drumm's claims for bankruptcy, as he owed it €9 million. It was alleged during the case that Drumm had transferred money and assets to his wife, so they could not be seized during the bankruptcy proceedings. In early 2015, the court ruled the application inadmissible, ruling that he could be held liable for debts of €10.5m in Ireland. In a 122-page ruling, the judge found Drumm was "not remotely credible", his conduct "both knowing and fraudulent", and accused Drumm of telling "outright lies".

Subsequently, the Irish Director of Public Prosecutions (DPP) recommended a number of charges be brought against Drumm, following investigation into Anglo Irish Bank by the Garda Bureau of Fraud Investigation and the Director of Corporate Enforcement. In January 2015, it was reported that the DPP was seeking the extradition of Drumm, and had filed papers with the US authorities. Drumm was arrested by US Marshals based in Boston on Sunday 11 October 2015, and expected to face extradition proceedings.

It was announced on 13 March 2016 that Drumm would be extradited back to Ireland from Boston to Dublin, to face 33 charges in the Irish Criminal Courts on 14 March. On 14 March, he was arrested by the Garda Síochána at Dublin Airport on arrival from Boston and taken to Ballymun Garda Station, where he was charged with 33 counts including forgery, counterfeiting documents, conspiracy to defraud, the unlawful giving of financial assistance in association with the purchase of shares, and disclosing false or misleading information in a management report.

== Conviction ==
On 6 June 2018, he was convicted of two charges of false accounting and conspiracy to defraud. In passing sentence, the Judge emphasised the difficult and unprecedented market conditions that prevailed at the time. She concluded, "This Court is not sentencing Mr Drumm for causing the financial crisis. Nor is this court sentencing Mr Drumm for the recession which occurred. This offending did not cause Anglo Irish Bank to collapse." His former colleagues John Bowe and Willie McAteer, along with the former chief executive of Irish Life & Permanent Denis Casey, were convicted of conspiracy to defraud in June 2016 and jailed for 6 years. He was released from prison on 15 February 2021.
