= Quinn v Irish Bank Resolution Corporation Ltd (In Special Liquidation) & ors =

Supreme Court of Ireland case

Quinn v Irish Bank Resolution Corporation Ltd (In Special Liquidation) & ors [2015] IESC 29, [2016] 1 IR 1
- Coat of Arms of Ireland
- Court: Supreme Court of Ireland
- Full case name: Quinn v Irish Bank Resolution Corporation Ltd (In Special Liquidation) & ors [2015] IESC 29, [2016] 1 IR 1
- Decided: 27 March 2015
- Citation: [2015] IESC 29, [2016] 1 IR 1 https://www.bailii.org/ie/cases/IESC/2015/S29.html https://ie.vlex.com/vid/quinn-v-ibrc-in-793726257

Case history
- Appealed from: High Court
- Appealed to: Supreme Court

Case opinions
- The Supreme Court considered whether a contract is automatically unenforceable if it is illegal. The Supreme Court decided that the Appeal was correct and that the Quinns could not rely Section 60 of the Companies Act of 1963 to support their claims of a violation.
- Decision by: Mr. Justice Clarke

Keywords
- Anglo Irish Bank Sean Quinn Companies Act Nationalisation Banking Supreme Court of Ireland Contract

Quinn v Irish Bank Resolution Corporation Ltd (In Special Liquidation) & ors [2015] IESC 29, [2016] 1 IR 1 is a reported Irish Supreme Court case decision. This case involved businessman Sean Quinn and his Family in their dealings with Anglo Irish Bank. This important decision was about whether or not a contract is automatically unenforceable if it is illegal.

== Background ==
Sean Quinn is a well known Irish businessman with five children. He built and formerly owned a large enterprise called Quinn Group. In 2005, he began to enter into contracts for difference trading with Anglo Irish Bank. With these contracts, the contractor can make money if the price of the inherent share in the company with which the contract is made goes up. But if the price of the share drops between when it was bought and when it was sold, the contractor has to pay the difference. Quinn bought these contracts through a company called Bazzely V Consultadoria Economica E Participacoes Sociedade Unipessoal LDA, which was registered in Madeira, Portugal. When the Anglo Irish Bank shares started to fall in the middle of 2007 Anglo began to call Quinn, asking him to pay what was owed under the contracts. In order to meet these repayments Quinn Group borrowed in several bundles over the next year, loans worth more than a billion euro. By 2007, the shares were worth 24% of Anglo's issued share capital. In the loan negotiations for the last 200 million bundle, Anglo had to give them to Quinn Family Properties because Bazzly did not have a functioning bank account. The Quinn family members used their assets in the Quinn Group Portfolio as security against the debt.

In 2009 Anglo Irish Bank was nationalised. For tax benefits the Quinns moved their shares with Anglo Irish Bank to six Cypriot companies. These companies were owned by the Quinn family and its loans were personally guaranteed by each of Sean Quinn's children, who owned one company each. The Quinn family claimed that these loans were illegal and unenforceable as they are allegedly in breach of section 60 of the Companies Act 1963 and the Market Abuse (Directive 2003/6/EC) Regulations 2005 (MAR). In 2011, Anglo Irish Bank brought a motion to the High Court requesting clarification as to whether the Quinn family can rely on these supposed breaches of legislation. Anglo Irish Bank argued that even if they are entitled to use them, there are self contained remedies within the contracts which prohibit the Quinn family from using the excuse of illegality of contract to stop their repayments. The Court ruled in favor of the Quinn family on the basis that section 60 in the Companies Act was not clear enough in its remedies stating:

I am not persuaded that Section 60 of the Companies Act 1963, which forbids a company from purchasing its own shares, or from offering financial assistance in that regard, is self-contained in its remedies and cannot impact on public policy. In a case such as that pleaded herein, the general law of illegality of contracts is entitled to respond in an appropriate and proportionate way so that loss caused through the manipulation of the share price of Anglo to those directly at the receiving end of that conduct, namely the Quinn's, can be appropriately responded to.

Anglo Irish Bank appealed this ruling.

=== Holding of the Supreme Court ===
The Court reviewed a large amount of case law when making its decision. The Supreme Court based its decision from the case of Holman v. Johnson where the court stated "no Court will lend its aid to a man who founds his cause of action upon an immoral or an illegal act". However, the Court also argues extensively about the consequences of a strict applicability of that rule and cites Les Laboratoires Servier and anor v. Apotex Inc. and ors. The Supreme Court ruled that when deciding whether the level of illegality is too high as to render it unenforceable, the Court should look to the public policy intentions of the statute in question. Regarding the Companies Act, the Court ruled that the contract was enforceable. To say otherwise could lead to a situation which is against the public policy intentions of the Companies Act. The court stated that Section 14, for example, would have no effect if every contract caught by Section 60 was to be declared unenforceable.

The main objective of the Market Abuse Regulation is to protect investors from people who take advantage of the market, so it covers a wide range of topics. So, the Court found again that making illegality apply to a lot of things could make the regulation less effective than it was meant to be.

The Quinn family argued that Anglo Irish Bank had sold them the shares while knowing that money would be used to buy more Anglo shares which is in contravention to both of the statutes mentioned above. However, the court found it was extremely unlikely that the Quinn family were unaware of what the underlying transactions were for and that they benefited from the reception of the property then. Therefore, they cannot return them to Anglo now after the fact.

In the end, the Court agreed with the appeal and it was decided that the Quinn family could not rely Section 60 of the Companies Act of 1963 to support their claims of a violation.

== See also ==
- Supreme Court of Ireland
- High Court (Ireland)
