= Actavo =

Irish industrial and engineering company

Actavo, formerly Siteserv, is an industrial and engineering services company headquartered in Dublin, Ireland. Described in a 2016 Business Post article as "one of Ireland's most controversial businesses", it has several divisions which provide events management services, modular buildings, scaffolding, fencing, safety equipment and telecommunications networks.

Originally known as Siteserv, the company was acquired by Denis O'Brien in March 2012. The sale of the company was the subject of significant controversy as Irish Bank Resolution Corporation (IBRC, formerly Anglo Irish Bank) wrote-off €119 million owed by Siteserv prior to its sale. A judicial Commission of Inquiry, the IBRC commission of investigation, investigated the circumstances of the sale. The commission's report, published in September 2022, found that Siteserv had provided "misleading and incomplete information" to IBRC.

The company, which rebranded as Actavo in 2015, accepted a contract with Babcock International in 2015 to maintain the Royal Navy surface fleet. This included the Type 23 frigate and the development of onboard technology. The contract ended in 2017, and resulted in 350 job losses.

As of 2018, the CEO of Actavo was Brian Kelly, and it had approximately 5,000 employees. Following a series of job cuts, this had reduced to approximately 2,000 employees by late 2020. As of 2023, it reportedly had approximately 1,900 staff.
