= Anglo Irish Bank Corporation Act 2009 =

Oireachtas
- Long title: An Act to provide, in the public interest, for maintaining the stability of the financial system in the State, and for that purpose—(a) to provide for the transfer to the Minister for Finance or the Minister's nominee of all the shares in Anglo Irish Bank Corporation Public Limited Company, (b) to extinguish certain rights in Anglo Irish Bank, (c) to disapply certain provisions of the Companies Acts and other enactments in so far as they relate to Anglo Irish Bank, (d) to provide for the removal of persons from certain offices, positions or employment with Anglo Irish Bank and the appointment of persons to those offices or positions or that employment, (e) to provide for the appointment of an Assessor to assess whether compensation should be paid to persons whose shares were transferred to the Minister for Finance or whose rights were extinguished, and if so to determine the fair and reasonable amount payable as such compensation, (f) to provide for the payment of any such compensation, (g) to make consequential amendments to certain other enactments, and (h) to provide for connected matters
- Citation: Anglo Irish Bank Corporation Act 2009 (Act 1). 21 January 2009.
- Territorial extent: Ireland
- Passed by: Dáil Éireann
- Passed: 20 January 2009
- Enacted: 20 January 2009
- Enacted by: Seanad Éireann
- Signed by: President Mary McAleese
- Signed: 21 January 2009
- Effective: 21 January 2009

Initiating chamber: Dáil Éireann
- Introduced by: Brian Lenihan Jnr; Minister for Finance
- Status: Current legislation

The Anglo Irish Bank Corporation Act 2009 is a piece of emergency legislation composed by the Irish government in January 2009. The Act provides for the emergency nationalisation of Anglo Irish Bank which had been subject to a controversy regarding hidden loans in December 2008. It was approved in the Dáil by a vote of 79 to 67, before passing in the Seanad without a vote on 20 January 2009. It was then signed by President Mary McAleese on 21 January 2009. The bank's shares had decreased dramatically on the stock exchange in previous days. At the time of its nationalisation, Anglo Irish Bank had 7,000 loan customers, of whom 5,000 were Irish.

== Oireachtas debates ==
The bill passed through the Oireachtas on 20–21 January 2009.

=== Dáil debate ===
The debate in Dáil Éireann lasted five hours and the bill was passed by 79 to 67. Opposition parties Fine Gael and Labour both voted against the legislation, citing a lack of clarity in the Government's proposals. Labour TD Pat Rabbitte regretted that the Dáil did not have the time to debate the matter properly, whilst the party's financial spokesman Joan Burton said there was a failure on the part of the Government to provide any relevant information about the financial situation of the bank. Minister for Finance Brian Lenihan said during the debate that Ireland's two other main banks, Allied Irish Banks (AIB) and Bank of Ireland, would not be nationalised despite they too enduring major falls in their share prices. He said the Government would instead stand by to inject up to €2 billion of public money into AIB and Bank of Ireland.

=== Seanad debate ===
The bill passed through Seanad Éireann without a vote; however there was a debate on the matter. During the Seanad's debate on the bill, Senator Shane Ross claimed that "no-one was being told the truth about Anglo Irish Bank" and called an Emergency General Meeting of shareholders which had taken place the previous Friday "a disgrace, show[ing] corporate Ireland at its worst, as there were no answers to any questions". Independent Senator Joe O'Toole advocated the chasing of those responsible for the bank's nationalisation "even into the courts", saying that a person could be imprisoned for failure to pay a household bill, yet those who caused the loss of jobs and pensions might not.
