= John Bowe (financier) =

Irish banker

John Bowe, former Head of Capital Markets at Anglo Irish Bank, born c. 1963.

== Background ==
A native of County Laois, Bowe was Director of Capital Markets of Anglo Irish Bank Corp. PLC (known as Irish Bank Resolution Corporation Limited). Other positions he held include NOL Group's businesses and operations in the US, Canada and Latin America, and President of Americas of NOL Group of Neptune Orient Lines Ltd.

Bowe became a number of former members of Anglo Irish Bank who were at the centre of a controversy in June 2013, concerning recorded comments they made some years previously in matters during the run-up to Ireland's economic crisis. His comments included:

If they saw the enormity of it up front, they might decide they have a choice. You know what I mean? "They might say the cost to the taxpayer is too high...if it doesn't look too big at the outset...if it doesn't look big, big enough to be important, but not too big that it kind of spoils everything, then, then I think you can have a chance.

In 2013, upon the release of the recordings, Bowe categorically denied misleading the Irish government in the lead-up to the bailout:

In a statement, Mr. Bowe said:

I categorically deny the allegation that I, at any time, misled the Central Bank or was aware of any strategy to do so. There were extensive discussions with the Central Bank particularly in or around the time period of September 2008. The phone call on 18 September 2008 was three days after Lehman Brothers filed for bankruptcy, and therefore took place during a period of severe and unprecedented market dislocation.

== Conviction ==
In June 2016 he was found guilty of conspiracy to defraud and sentenced to two years in prison the following month. In the same trial, Denis Casey was sentenced to two years and nine months and Willie McAteer was sentenced to three and a half years. The fraud consisted of Anglo Irish Bank lending €7.2bn to Irish Life and Permanent, which placed the same sum back with Anglo Irish Bank, where it was accounted for on an end of year balance sheet as customer deposits instead of an inter-bank loan.

The trial lasted 89 days and was the longest trial in the history of the state at that time.

== See also ==
- Ó Buadhaigh
