= IBRC commission of investigation =

The IBRC commission of investigation was an Irish government commission of investigation to look into the transactions of Irish Bank Resolution Corporation (IBRC) that led to its failure.

The commission was established by the Oireachtas under the Commission of Investigation (Irish Bank Resolution Corporation) Order 2015 passed by Dáil Éireann and Seanad Éireann on 10 June 2015 to investigate transactions of IBRC.

It was composed of the chairperson and sole member, originally Mr Justice Daniel O'Keeffe, and subsequently Judge Brian Cregan. The original Chairperson Mr. Justice O’Keeffe informed the Government that, for personal reasons, he was unable to continue to act as chairperson of the commission; he was replaced by Judge Brian Cregan, a judge of the High Court.

== Terms of Reference ==
The commission's term of reference were to investigate all transactions by IBRC between 21 January 2009 and 7 February 2013 which resulted in a capital loss to IBRC of at least €10,000,000 (either in one or more transactions relating to the same borrower). It shall also investigate all transactions which might give rise to public concern in respect of the ultimate returns to the taxpayer. Further details of the terms of reference are set out in the Commission of Investigation (Irish Bank Resolution Corporation) Order 2015. It did not only examine transactions relating to the acquisition of assets by the National Asset Management Agency (NAMA).

However the terms of reference were very broad and the commission had a great degree of discretion as to the transactions it could investigate. The Minister for Finance stated in the Dail that "the commission will have the power to investigate any transaction of any value that gives rise or is likely to give rise to potential public concerns, regardless of the level of loss", including verbal agreements and was apparently not confined to the time-limits in the terms of reference.

== Cost and timing ==
The commission was fully resourced and had its own staff. It cost an estimated €4 million for 2015.

Although the original term was that the commission should report by 31 December 2015, the Taoiseach almost immediately stated that it might extend beyond that period but an interim report would be expected by December 2015.

The Commission submitted a series of requests during 2016 in tandem with its first three interim reports. On the third occasion in June 2016, the Taoiseach revised the time frame for the submission of the commission's final report until the end of October 2016. The commissioner's terms of reference were changed to focus on the 2012 sale of Siteserv to a company owned by businessman Denis O'Brien for €45.5 million, with a write-off of €110 million in loans. The cost of this new commission were later estimated by the new Taoiseach, Leo Varadkar, to be in the range of €20-25 million in February 2018, at which point the commission had spent over €1.2 million.

== Final report ==
As of March 2023, the commission had issued fifteen interim reports and had been granted numerous extensions to publication of its final report, which was finally published in May 2023, with a total cost of €19 million.
