= Mannok =

Northern Irish business group

- Type: Privately owned
- Industry: Building construction & manufacturing, hospitality & property management
- Founded: 1973 as Quinn Group; 2013 as Aventas Group; 2014 as Quinn Industrial Holdings
- Headquarters: Derrylin, County Fermanagh, Northern Ireland
- Products: Container glass, domestic and specification radiators, cement, tarmac, thermal blocks, rooftiles, prestressed concrete, polyurethane & polystyrene insulation, packaging
- Website: mannokholdings.com

Mannok, formerly the QUINN group, is a business group headquartered in Derrylin, County Fermanagh, Northern Ireland. The group has ventured into cement and concrete products, container glass, general insurance, radiators, plastics, hotels, and real estate. It was formed by Seán Quinn in 1973, developing from a small quarrying operation in Derrylin into a large organization, employing over 8,000 people in various locations throughout Europe.

From 2004 the group saw great expansion throughout Europe, with radiator and plastic manufacturing plants in the United Kingdom, Germany, Belgium, France, Spain and Slovakia. The group property portfolio also includes hotel and business centres in Poland, Bulgaria, Ukraine, Turkey, and Russia. Its first venture into the cement industry was in 1989. The commissioning of its first container glass plant was in 1998. It acquired the health insurer Bupa Ireland in 2007.

On 30 March 2010, following an application by the Central Bank of Ireland, the High Court appointed joint provisional administrators to Quinn Insurance Limited.

In April 2011, a share receiver was appointed to Anglo Irish Bank (to which the Quinn Group owed over €2.8 billion), who took control of the Quinn family's equity interest in the Quinn Group. Seán Quinn and his family no longer have any role in the management, operations or ownership of the group. Seán Quinn was declared bankrupt in the Republic of Ireland on 16 January 2012.

In November 2013, the group was renamed from QUINN to Aventas. In 2014, the group was renamed as Quinn Industrial Holdings (QIH). In 2020, the company rebranded as Mannok.

== Financial situation ==
As a private company registered in Ireland, it files annual statements with the Companies Registration Office. The last accounts were filed in October 2009. The company reported a net profit of €68.9 million for the year to December 2008, based on gross sales of €2,264.4 million. Although it had reported an operating profit in its two main divisions, insurance and non-insurance (e.g. cement, property) for each of the last 3 years, the company was impacted by significant provisions in 2006 and 2007.

Despite the reported profit of €69.9 million in the year to December 2008, the Group's shareholders equity fell by over €220 million in the year, partly due to a €200 million distribution and other recognized losses that were not applied to the Income Statement but appeared directly in shareholders equity. Over the 3-year period to December 2008, the Group revalued upward its assets and investments by a net cumulative €306 million, which positively impacted shareholders equity. Over the same period it took a charge to equity of a net cumulative €312 million due to adverse exchange rate movements.

Further complicating the financial picture of the Group's financial statements is a collection of other related party transactions. In the year to December 2008, the Group reported an income of €150 million from the Quinn family and related entities, for services provided by the Group including: "the identification of sites for acquisition and development, the negotiation of purchase price, the negotiation and arrangement of financing, the engagement of developers and related professional advisors and the ongoing monitoring of the projects through the construction phase." For accounting purposes, these incomes, totaling €221 million in 2008, would have been included in the income statement that lead to the reported profit of €68.9 million in the year to December 2008.

At the end of December 2008, the Quinn family and related undertakings had loans of €891.3 million to Quinn Group (ROI) Limited. The annual report for 2008 states in the "related party transactions" section that Group had taken a total of €888m of provisions related to loans given to family controlled property companies, investment and finance companies, and other family controlled companies. Of these provisions, €785.6 million related to the investment and finance companies which includes Quinn Finance Holdings, the entity that owned an economic interest of 15% in Anglo Irish Bank. Provisions of €888m accounted for against the €891m of loans, may indicate the family and the related entities may be unlikely to repay over 99% of these loans to Group.

In April 2011 Kieran Wallace of KPMG was appointed as share receiver to Anglo Irish Bank (to which the Quinn Group owe over €2.8 billion) and took control of the Quinn family's equity interest in Quinn Group. Sean Quinn and the Quinn family no longer have any role in the management, operations or ownership of the Quinn Group. Quinn was declared bankrupt on 11 November 2011 in Northern Ireland; this was annulled on appeal but he was declared bankrupt in the Republic of Ireland on 16 January 2012.

== Divisions ==
=== Manufacturing ===
The manufacturing division's main activities are the manufacture and supply of cement and concrete products including, rooftiles, prestress flooring, Quinn-lite blocks, polystyrene insulation products, tarmac and general quarry products. QUINN Quarries are involved in the extraction and processing of sand and gravel since the 1970s, the Quarries Division of the Group still produces these products today. Quarry stone, washed sand, gravel, ready mixed concrete and concrete blocks are all produced at Quinn plants. The second quarry in Williamstown, County Galway was founded in 1977 to supply Galway and the surrounding counties with quarry and concrete products.

==== Rooftiles ====
QUINN Rooftiles commenced production in 1982, with a purpose built factory at Gortmullen, Derrylin. This first plant was commissioned in 1982. However, due to market demand a new factory built on the existing site commenced production in 2001 and was expanded again in 2005. Quinn Rooftiles is a major supplier to the construction sector throughout the Republic of Ireland. QUINN Prestressed began producing prestressed concrete products in 1984. All of these products are used in a range of domestic and industrial building applications. QUINN Lite produces lightweight thermal blocks for use in the construction of internal and external walls and the inner and outer leaves of cavity walls. QUINN Lite Pac, Granard, County Longford was founded in 1975 to produce and distribute expanded polystyrene thermal insulation products for the construction industry. The product is an expanded polystyrene board for insulating floors. A large proportion of this product is used in the insulation of commercial, industrial and domestic buildings.

==== Therm ====
QUINN Therm, at Scotchtown, Ballyconnell, County Cavan was commissioned in October 2004 to produce and distribute rigid polyurethane thermal insulation products for the Irish and UK markets. Aventas Therm produces rigid foam board for cavity wall insulation. QUINN Tarmac was established in 1994 to produce a range of blacktop products. Aventas Cement has been in production since 1989 at its Derrylin site using local raw material from the quarry facilities. Because of increasing demand from the construction sector, a second plant was commissioned in 2000 in the northern part of the Republic of Ireland, outside the small town of Ballyconnell and close to the Northern Ireland border.

==== Plastics ====
In May 2004, the group acquired Barlo Group PLC. This led to the announcement of the formation of Quinn Plastics on 1 January 2005. Barlo Plastics was created in 1998 by the merger of four plastic sheet producers and further expanded by four sheet extrusion companies in 1999 and 2000. The company's main business lies in the production of domestic and industrial transparent plastic sheet products, including building and construction, interior design and safety. It produces 90,000 tonnes annually and employs over 700 people. Headquartered in Derrylin, County Fermanagh, the company has operating facilities in Belgium, France, Germany, Spain, Slovakia, the UK and the Czech Republic. In 2005, the company purchased Polyex, a UK start-up business that is now the base for their Alfreton production site. It provides products for many different applications. In October 2013, it was rebranded as Polycasa. In 2015, the group sold Polycasa to Swiss company, Schweiter Technologies, for a price of €120 million.

==== Packaging ====
QUINN Packaging (trading as Barlo Packaging until 2004) has provided rigid packaging for the food industry from its plant in Newbridge since the 1980s, when the markets for dairy spreads and yellow fats emerged. Quinn packaging also has a factory in Ballyconnell, built in 2006, that produces food trays, film and thin gauge sheet for the food packaging industry.

==== Power ====
As a large user of electricity within its manufacturing base, it constructed a five megawatt wind farm in 1995 on the Slieve Rushen Mountain, which nestles behind the core manufacturing base of the Group at Derrylin. This was further complemented in 2004 by the addition of a 13.5-megawatt wind farm at Snugborough, Ballyconnell, County Cavan. The power it generates is fed into the National Grid. The Group is in the planning stages of further developments in this area. These are set to include a €300 million, 450-megawatt combined cycle gas turbine in County Louth, which has been approved and fast-tracked by An Bord Pleanala under the state's Strategic Infrastructure Bill. It will supply up to 8% of Ireland's peak demand and is set to come online in 2010 despite the slump. Plans for a similar project in County Galway are at a pre-consultation stage. Quinn Environmental also operate a small 500 kW Landfill gas utilization plant at their Lisbane landfill site in Tandragee, County Armagh, which supplies energy to the NIE grid.

==== Glass ====
In 1998, the Group moved into the container glass market with the establishment of QUINN Glass, which manufactures glass containers for the food and beverage industries, with operations in Ireland and the UK. The first plant went into production at the end of 1998, producing a range of flint, green and amber containers. The plant is based in Derrylin and employs over 370 staff with an annual production capacity of 720 million containers. This is expected to increase to 830 million units in 2008 with the completion of a furnace rebuild at the plant. Quinn Glass is one of only a handful of plants worldwide where bottles can be manufactured and filled on a single site. It features one of the largest automated warehouses in Europe, capable of handling 282,000 pallets of filled and unfilled glass containers.

In 2005, it expanded, and built a second plant at Elton, Cheshire, creating over 550 new jobs. It produces 20 per cent of the UK's glass container requirements and provides a glass packaging, filling and distribution service for the drinks industry. The facilities at the plant include a beverage filling hall, warehousing, two glass melting furnaces and 13 production lines. The capacity of the second plant is currently 1.2 billion units, with production capacity of both plants estimated to be 2.4 billion units in 2008. The plant has five lines capable of bottling a total of 400 bottles of wine, or 1,000 bottles of beer a minute. Having manufacturing and bottling on the same site can reduce costs and keep prices competitive. By offering bottling services, there is the potential for glass makers to win more business as an overflow plant in times of high demand, and it is as a contract packing operation that the greatest benefits from bottling lines are likely to be had. However, the plant was constructed without the correct planning permission, and on 8 April 2009, the High Court ruled that it should be demolished. Quinn have announced their intention to appeal the decision.

==== Radiators ====
In May 2004, the Quinn Group acquired the Barlo Group, leading to the announcement of the formation of Quinn Radiators on 1 January 2005. This gave the new group: a production facility in Leigh which produces the "roundtop" range; a second in Grobbendonk, Belgium, which produces the "compact" range; and until the plant's closure in 2008, represented in Ireland through the Merriott brand based in Clonmel, County Tipperary.

At the start of 2007, a new radiator facility employing 500 people went into production in Newport, South Wales, in part of the never-occupied former LG television plant. Becoming the divisions new European headquarters, the aim is to expand the facility to become the largest domestic radiator plant in the world, producing four million radiators a year by 2008.

In 2022 the Newport factory closed down and was demolished.

== Former QUINN divisions ==
=== Financial Services ===
QUINN Direct Insurance Limited (QUINN Financial Services) was a general insurance company that was established in Ireland in 1996 by the Quinn Group. The company expanded and opened an office on O'Connell Street, Dublin, in 1997. In March 2003, Ian Pearson, Minister for Enterprise, Trade and Investment, announced the opening of the new offices in Enniskillen. The company moved into the UK Commercial business, where it operated through its Salford Quays office in Manchester from 2003.

QUINN Life Direct was launched in 2000 as an entity separate from Quinn Insurance. It offered financial services to customers in Ireland and its core business consisted of investments, savings, pensions and retirement plans; however, the company also offered pensions and savings under the "Freeway" brand. In February 2007, QUINN Healthcare entered the Irish health insurance market with the completion of its takeover of BUPA Ireland Limited's business.

In October 2008, the Financial Regulator required Quinn Insurance Limited to pay a monetary penalty of over €3 million for failure to notify the Regulator before providing loans to related companies.

Consultancy firm Thomas Carroll, posted on its website that Quinn Insurance was placed into "Provisional Administration" on 30 March 2010 by the Irish Financial Regulator. The article stated:

The Irish Times reports that Council for the regulator said that the company had "significantly breached" its solvency ratios in recent months. Further concern arose following the disclosure that subsidiaries of Quinn Insurance made guarantees in relation to the group's asset which had the effect of reducing the insurer's assets by 448m euros.

QUINN Financial Services was banned from continuing business in the UK, although it was still free to transact business in Ireland. On 15 April 2010, the Irish Times reported that Quinn Insurance decided not to fight the appointment of a permanent administrator.

In February 2012 Irish Life and Permanent took over the majority of Quinn's life assurance and pension business.

=== Hotels ===
The group own eight hotels located in Ireland, the United Kingdom and Europe. The list of current hotel properties includes:

- The four-star Buswells Hotel
- The five-star Hilton Hotel in Prague
- The four-star Slieve Russell Hotel, near Ballyconnell, County Cavan
- The five-star Hilton Hotel in Sofia
- The Crowne Plaza in Cambridge
- Holiday Inn in Nottingham
- The Ibis Hotel in Prague
- The five-star Hilton Hotel in Kraków

=== Property ===
QUINN Property is a division of the group which specialises in the development and management of commercial real-estate for lease in a number of markets across Europe. Current properties include the Leonardo Business Centre and Univermag shopping centre in Ukraine, the Kutuzoff Tower and Caspiy Business Centre in Moscow, Kazan Logistics Park in Kazan, and the Russian DIY store Stroiarsenal in Yekaterinburg. The group acquired Prestige Mall in Istanbul, Turkey, in 2007 and sold it to MSFD Gayrimenkul A.Ş. in 2013. The shopping mall closed in August 2025. Along with the rest of the Quinn Group, it is in administration while efforts are made to identify and sell off properties to pay off its €2.8 billion of loans.

=== Energy ===
In 2007, the QUINN Group applied for planning permission for natural-gas-fired power stations at Toomes in County Louth and Toherroe, County Galway, to generate 450 and 400–450 megawatts respectively. They would be among the biggest power stations ever built in Ireland.

Planning for the station in Toomes was granted on 30 May 2008 by An Bord Pleanála, as one of the first cases under the Strategic Infrastructure Act 2006 against the Inspector's recommendation, which argued that "the proposed development would be a discordant and incongruous feature in the local rural landscape, would contravene materially the Development Plan and would therefore be contrary to the proper planning and development of the area."

The planned development was not progressed.

== Financial uncertainty in early 2010 ==
The Central Bank of Ireland authorised the Quinn Group to borrow €169 million from Anglo Irish Bank in order to buy Anglo Irish shares (which subsequently had to be nationalised at a cost of €5,500 for every man, woman and child in the State). The Central Bank's actions were described as "like the Vatican running an abortion clinic." At a meeting with the Chairman of Quinn Insurance, the Central Bank didn't think it was "fair or appropriate" to "tackle" the tycoon on his investments.

On 30 March 2010, following an application by Ireland's Financial Regulator, the High Court appointed joint provisional administrators to Quinn Insurance Limited. According to the Irish Independent, eight subsidiaries of Quinn Insurance provided guarantees of €1.2bn to cover Quinn Group's debts, prompting the regulator to seek the appointment of provisional administrators in the High Court. In total, the Quinn family is estimated to have taken out €2.8 billion worth of loans from the Anglo Irish Bank and the Quinn Group is responsible for an additional €1.2 billion in loaned money—as of July 2012, the due dates for these loans is unknown.

According to the Financial Times, a number of UK based Insurance companies had warned regulators over a number of years that they believed Quinn Insurance's property and casualty business was unsustainable. The FT stated that a number of London-based firms had written to the UK Financial Regulator, the FSA, stating that "no insurer could systematically charge premium rates that were often significantly lower than all its rivals over an extended period and remain viable". Both the UK and Irish regulators refused to comment on the story. However, the Irish Regulator, has directed the provisional administrators to ensure that Quinn Insurance ceases writing new business in the UK to prevent the company "suffering further financial losses from its currently unprofitable UK business".

Given the magnitude of the loans to Anglo Irish Bank the company was reported to be considering a €700 million financial rescue of the Quinn Group. The plan, would see €150m injected into Quinn Insurance and €550 million would be used to pay off bondholders. Anglo Irish Bank would become majority shareholder in the Quinn Group.

The Quinn Group took action to counter the moves by the Financial Regulator including the mobilisation of its employees into street protests., The Group furthermore rejected press speculation that the Group needs €700 million of financing. Instead the Group estimates that a cash injection of between €100m and €150m is required. refusing to speculate on the need for a €550 million payment to bondholders, it noted that a re-financing, if it occurred, would not necessarily increase the overall debts of the Group.

On 15 April 2010, the Irish Times reported that Quinn Insurance decided not to fight the appointment of a permanent administrator. According to RTÉ, Quinn Insurance believed it may have a better chance if it were dealing with a full-time administrator, and has increasingly been concerned about the damage it is suffering as a result of the ban on it doing business in the UK.

== Intimidation campaign ==
A series of attacks on company property and staff have happened since August 2011. First was an arson attack on the family car of Paul O'Brien, the chief executive of Aventas, at his home in Ratoath, County Meath. In November 2013 a crane valued at €250,000 belonging to the group was set on fire in Ballinamore, County Leitrim. In January 2014 a 52-seater bus was filled with tyres, set on fire and driven into a group factory complex in Ballyconnell.

On 1 February 2019 two directors of QIH were assaulted at the Apple Green Service Station in Co Cavan. On 19 March 2021 in Cavan Circuit Court James Bernard McGovern, a medal-winning boxer from Fermanagh, pleaded guilty to assaulting Kevin Lunney and Dara O'Reilly in February 2021.

In September 2019, Kevin Lunney, chief operations officer of Quinn Industrial Holdings, was kidnapped outside his home in County Fermanagh and taken to a farm in County Cavan where he was beaten, slashed with a knife, his leg was broken, and 'QIH' was carved on his torso; he was then soaked in bleach and abandoned by the side of a road. According to a defence lawyer, the intention was to open up executive positions at the company by driving out current managers. In October 2019 a new threat against directors in a letter sent to The Irish News, saying it was their "final warning" and that "we could have killed Kevin very easily". Three men were found guilty in November 2021 of false imprisonment and intentionally causing harm, and were sentenced the following month to between 18 and 30 years in prison. Seán Quinn has repeatedly condemned the violence.

In the early hours of 15 February 2020 two vehicles belonging to a cousin of a QIH director were subject to an arson attack. The attack was captured on CCTV. Nobody was injured and damage was minimal.
