= Toomes =

Townland in County Louth, Ireland

Coordinates: 53.964°N 6.576°W

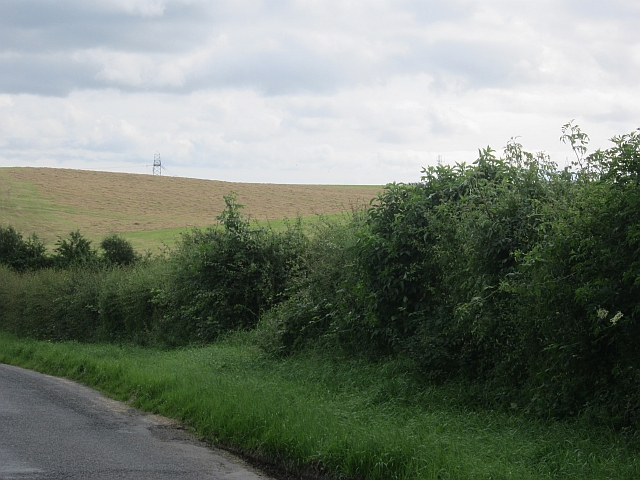
Toomes townland

Toomes (Irish: Na Toim) is a townland in County Louth, Ireland. It is close to the village of Louth and within the civil parish of the same name. Toomes townland, which has an area of approximately 1.4 km^{2} (350 acres), had a population of 5 people as of 2011.

In 2007, the Quinn Group applied to build a natural gas-fired combined cycle gas turbine (CCGT) power station in the area. There was significant local opposition to the plans, in particular as the area was zoned for farming and residential use. While the Quinn Group received permission for the proposed development in mid-2008, by early 2009 the project was "on hold", and by 2011 it was reportedly "very unlikely" that it would progress. By 2022, the proposed power station had not progressed, and it was proposed to build a "184 acre solar farm" between Toomes and nearby Monvallet.
