= Bank of Ireland v O'Donnell & ors =

Irish Supreme Court case

- Coat of arms of Ireland
- Court: Supreme Court of Ireland
- Citations: Bank of Ireland v O'Donnell & ors [2015] IESC 90

Court membership
- Judges sitting: Denham C.J, MacMenamin J and Laffoy

Case opinions
- The Supreme Court determined that appellant's who are bankrupt do not have locus standi to bring an appeal. The Supreme Court also considered objective bias.

Keywords
- Objective bias, Bankruptcy, Recusal

Bank of Ireland v O'Donnell & ors [2015] IESC 90 is an Irish Supreme Court case that centred around whether the appellants had any right or capacity to bring a motion before the court. They wanted to seek an order of a stay on Mr Justice McGovern's order dated 24 July 2014. In their appeal, they referred to the principle of objective bias and Mr Justice McGovern's refusal to recuse himself. The Supreme Court rejected the application for a stay and held that the law regarding objective bias was clearly stated in the lower court.

== Background ==
The case began in 2011, but had been moved to the desk of McGovern J after Kelly J was accused of objective bias.

Brian and Mary Patricia O'Donnell, the appellants, were a married couple who brought a motion to the Court in order to remove any ownership they had in a variety of companies and properties. They sought to transfer them to their two sons, Blake O'Donnell and Bruce O'Donnell, the other two appellants. They had applied to the Supreme Court for a stay on an order made by McGovern J, which adjudicated their relationship with the plaintiffs in that case and Bank of Ireland, the respondent in this case.

== Holding of the Supreme Court ==
The Supreme Court, made up of Denham C.J, MacMenamin J and Laffoy J in a unanimous decision dismissed the motion. The ruling was split into two parts, dealing with Mr and Mrs O'Donnell and their sons separately.

Brian and Mary Patricia O' Donnell were declared bankrupt in 2013 and thus, their property rights were conferred to the Official Assignee as per section 44 of the Bankruptcy Act 1988. They sought an order of a stay on the order of McGovern J. Under section 3 of the same Act, the term 'property' includes the right to litigate, which now rested with the Official Assignee as Mr and Mrs O'Donnell were declared bankrupt. Therefore, the Court found that this meant the first two appellants, Brian O'Donnell and Mary Patricia O'Donnell did not have locus standi. Although, some personal actions may rest with the appellants as opposed to the Official Assignee, litigation is not one of them. Subsequently, Mr and Mrs O'Donnell did not have the capacity to bring a motion before the court. The order for a stay could only be accepted if it is initiated by the Official Assignee in this case. Thus, the Court decided that Mr and Mrs O'Donnell could not raise a motion before the court as they did not have the capacity to do so and so dismissed their application for a stay.

The remaining appellants, Bruce and Blake O'Donnell faced the same result. The Court found no reasons as to why they should be given a stay. They questioned McGovern J's previous connection with the Bank of Ireland and alleged it could be the sole reason for his partiality towards the respondents (Bank of Ireland). However, the Court rejected their arguments of objective bias by referring to McGovern J's statement on that matter. He stated that he at the time had no outstanding debt with Bank of Ireland, although he had had in the past. Ultimately, the fact that McGovern J had a mortgage loan with Bank of Ireland in the past is not a valid reason for his recusal, as to do so is unreasonable. The only account he has with them is a current or savings account. Merely having a bank account with the said bank for his own private matters is irrelevant to this case as neither was he a shareholder nor did Bank of Ireland owe him any money. Furthermore, McGovern J went on to make the point that in a banking sector as small as Ireland's it would be impractical for every judge to step down each time they came upon a case in which the respondents were the ones they had personal banking arrangements with. In the matter of adjudicating the judgement for a stay the Court relied on Danske Bank v. McFadden. The Court also held that "[t]he law as to objective bias has been clearly stated by this Court: see Bula Ltd v. Tara Mines Ltd [2000] 4 I.R. 412; Kenny v. Trinity College Dublin [2008] 2 IR 40; O’Callaghan v. Mahon [2008] 2 IR 514; O’Ceallaigh v. An Bord Altranais [2011] IESC 50." Blake O'Donnell and Bruce O'Donnell, were not, therefore, granted an order for a stay either. However, the court did agree to prioritise this appeal case and hold a directions hearing with the parties concerned.

The Court therefore denied the application for a stay, and the motion was dismissed.

== Subsequent developments ==
Mr Brian O'Donnell claimed he would be taking his case to the European courts as he was deeply unsatisfied with the decision of the Supreme Court. However, the Supreme Court in its ruling said there are no solid issues on the basis of which the case can be referred to the Court of Justice of the European Union.

== See also ==
- Supreme Court of Ireland
- Standing (law)
