= Irish Nationwide Building Society =

Defunct Irish financial institution

Irish Nationwide Building Society was a financial institution in Ireland from 1873 to 2011. One of the country's oldest financial institutions, it was originally called the Irish Industrial Building Society; it changed its name in 1975 when it had just five staff. It ceased to exist when its assets, liabilities and branch network were transferred to Anglo Irish Bank.

The headquarters of Irish Nationwide were in Grand Parade, Dublin 6. The society's chairman was Danny Kitchen and its last chief executive was Gerry McGinn who succeeded Michael Fingleton in 2009. It had around 100,000 members, with a branch network throughout Ireland. It also had branches in Belfast and London in the UK, and an Isle of Man division, based in Douglas.

Irish Nationwide (IOM) Ltd ("INIOM") under a different name, Permanent Bank International Ltd, remained operating in Douglas, Isle of Man. It closed down on 15 December 2017. Permanent Bank International Ltd was a wholly owned subsidiary of Permanent TSB Group Holdings plc ("PTSB") and was licensed by the Financial Supervision Commission of the Isle of Man to take deposits. PBI was a participant in the Isle of Man Depositors' Compensation Scheme as set out in the Depositors' Compensation Scheme Regulations 2010.

PTSB is registered in Ireland, regulated by the Central Bank of Ireland and take deposits in the name of Permanent TSB. PBI placed funds with other parts of its group and thus its financial standing was linked to that of the group. Depositors could form their own view on the financial standing of PBI, and the group, based on publicly available information. (Note: The latest report and accounts are available at)

"High risk and sloppy lending practices at the Building Society were reported to the Central Bank of Ireland by external accountants over a long period but did not change its behaviour", according to the management team which took over in 2010. The former head of compliance became a whistle blower by reporting "dodgy practices." Separately the vice chairman told the CBOI of his concerns in great detail, but again they did nothing.

It reported a loss of €2.5 billion for 2009 after writing off €2.8 billion in loans – almost one-quarter of its loan book. The chairman said "I don’t think it is an understatement to say that the losses are truly shocking, particularly in an undertaking the size of Irish Nationwide,".

In August 2010 the building society required a €5.4 billion government bailout to stay afloat, leaving it effectively in state ownership. A letter which the Central Bank of Ireland received concerning the legality of the loans by the building society to Sean FitzPatrick had "gone missing". Management at Irish Nationwide used to arrange meetings with the Central Bank of Ireland for late on a Friday afternoon, knowing that their staff would not want for the encounter to last for more than an hour because it would nibble into their weekend.

On 24 February 2011, the deposits of Irish Nationwide were sold to Irish Life and Permanent. The building society was consequently split between its deposit book and its loan book, which was to be merged with Anglo Irish Bank In June 2011, Irish Life and Permanent itself collapsed into full state ownership. Following a court order, on 1 July 2011 all of Irish Nationwide's remaining assets and liabilities (including the branch network) were transferred to Anglo Irish Bank with immediate effect. The new merged institution was named "Irish Bank Resolution Corporation." In making the transfer order the Finance Minister, Michael Noonan, "noted the importance of the name change for the new entity in order to remove the negative international references associated with the appalling failings of both institutions and their previous managements."

Former banker and British regulator, Scott J Dobbie, prepared a report in August 2012 following Nationwide's collapse, finding that the Financial Regulator "understood and delineated the critical INBS issues well before they caused trouble, but equally failed fully to use its powers under the [Building Societies] Act by pursuing these issues, being apparently mollified by bland assurances" and the Central Bank "did not meet standards which might be reasonably expected".

== See also ==
- List of banks in the Republic of Ireland
