= Ó Buadhaigh =

Ó Buadhaigh is a Gaelic Irish surname.

== Background ==
Now rendered Bowe(s) and found mainly in counties Carlow, Laois, Kilkenny, Tipperary and Waterford, the original surname represented a sept of the Éile; specifically, a sept of the Éile Uí Chearbhaill. They left, or were expelled, from Éile Uí Chearbhaill sometime around or before 1200. By the 1290s, they were found as O'Bothy, O'Bouy, and other forms located in Osraighe, Tipperary, and Loígis.

A number of other families of the name, or one like it, are found elsewhere in Ireland. All are probably native, and distinct from bearers of the surname in Britain.

== Notables ==
- Tommy Bowe (born 1984), Irish rugby union footballer
- John Bowe (Irish financier)
