= Seán FitzPatrick =

Irish banker (1948–2021)

- Born: 25 May 1948; County Wicklow, Ireland
- Died: 8 November 2021 (aged 73)
- Known for: Chairman of Anglo Irish Bank

Seán FitzPatrick (25 May 1948 – 8 November 2021) was an Irish banker who was chief executive and then chairman of Anglo Irish Bank, until he resigned in December 2008 amid mounting revelations over hidden loans. The scandal precipitated a collapse of the bank's share price which in turn led to its nationalisation on 21 January 2009. He was declared bankrupt in 2010. He was later prosecuted but acquitted of any criminal offence in relation to his role in the banking crisis.

FitzPatrick qualified as a chartered accountant, and was appointed as Chief Executive of Anglo Irish Bank in 1986. He led the Bank through a series of mergers and strong subsequent growth into a position amongest the largest banks in the country, though it became over-concentrated in the property development sector.

== Early life ==
Mr FitzPatrick was born in County Wicklow, Ireland. His father was a small farmer and his mother was a civil servant who left the workforce to raise her children. FitzPatrick's only sibling, his older sister, Joyce, would go on to become the sixth President of National College of Ireland. FitzPatrick was educated locally at Presentation College, Bray. Following this he attended University College Dublin in 1966 to study commerce. In 1969 he joined Reynolds, McCarron & O'Connor an accountancy practice, and qualified as a Chartered Accountant. He married his wife Caitríona in 1974.

== Career ==
=== Banking ===
FitzPatrick joined the Irish Bank of Commerce in 1974. By 1980, this bank had merged with City of Dublin Bank and the new entity acquired Anglo Irish Bank. The bank appointed Fitzpatrick as the head of its new subsidiary, Anglo Irish Bank. In 1986, the City of Dublin bank renamed itself "Anglo Irish Bank", and FitzPatrick was appointed Chief Executive. He served in this position until 2005, when he became the bank's Chairman.

He transformed the bank from a small Dublin-focused lender into a national competitor to Allied Irish Banks and Bank of Ireland. The Bank cultivated a close relationship with its clients, speeded up credit applications and expansion into business lending that the main banks would not support. The business prospered and the economic boom in Ireland ensured strong profitability for Anglo Irish, and it was valued at EUR€13 billion. The bank also expanded into markets in the United Kingdom and United States. Assets under management grew from $4.5 billion in 1998 to $136 billion in 2008. The balance sheet grew by, on average, 36% annually, above the 20% regulators usually regard as unwise. However, over the time the bank had become heavily concentrated in property development lending.

FitzPatrick was appointed to a number of positions by Fianna Fáil politicians. In 1998 the then Minister for the Environment and Local Government Noel Dempsey appointed FitzPatrick to the Dublin Docklands Development Authority where he served until 2007. FitzPatrick was also appointed a non-executive director to the Irish airline Aer Lingus in March 2004 by the prominent Fianna Fáil politician and then Minister for Transport Séamus Brennan.

In an RTÉ Radio 1 interview on The Marian Finucane Show in October 2008, FitzPatrick denied critics' charges that the bank had been reckless in making too many big loans to property developers as Ireland's property bubble grew. While saying he was grateful for the state's help, he refused to offer taxpayers an apology, saying, "The cause of our problems are global, so I can't say sorry with any degree of sincerity and decency. But I can say thank you." FitzPatrick addressed the government in another speech on the same day and recommended cutting spending on what he called the "sacred cows" of Irish society: children, the elderly and health care.

=== Resignation ===
In December 2008, FitzPatrick resigned as chairman when details of secret loans he had taken out with the bank were revealed; the resulting furore also swept from office Ireland's chief banking regulator, Patrick Neary. FitzPatrick, while Anglo Irish chairman, had borrowed more than €100 million from the bank and hid the loans from auditors for eight years. The former multi-millionaire banker defaulted on the loans following a series of major business setbacks, valuable shareholding in Anglo Irish Bank once worth €80 million is now worthless followed by a failed oil venture in Africa and a stake in a casino in Asia stalled. His property investments in Ireland and Hungary were also hit by the international slump.

Both FitzPatrick and the bank said in statements on his resignation that his handling of the loans was neither illegal nor a breach of Irish banking regulations. FitzPatrick stated that "It is clear to me, on reflection, that it was inappropriate and unacceptable from a transparency point of view." The new Bank Chairman Donal O’Connor told shareholders that FitzPatrick's loans were "wrong and unacceptable". The following day, headlines in the Irish papers illuminated the popular mood: "Seán FitzPatrick Should Go To Jail" competed with "If FitzPatrick Lived in New York, He'd Have Been Arrested By Now".

When he resigned from Anglo Irish Bank, FitzPatrick also resigned his non-executive directorships at Greencore, Aer Lingus, Smurfit Kappa, Experian, and Gartmore Irish Growth Fund.

=== Arrests and acquittal ===
On 16 March 2010 Gardaí were given a warrant to search Seán FitzPatrick's house. FitzPatrick was arrested at around 06:30 on 18 March 2010 at his house in Greystones, County Wicklow, by the Garda Bureau of Fraud Investigation. He was questioned under Section 4 of the Criminal Justice Act 1984. Under this he was able to be held for up to six hours without charge, but this was later extended. The Gardaí were also assisting another investigation by the Director of Corporate Enforcement for breach of company law. The Gardaí confirmed in a statement that "There is an extensive Garda investigation under way, eager to see justice take its course" In most western countries it is illegal to run a business and seek investment while insolvent. It was not confirmed by the Gardaí at first if FitzPatrick was the person in their custody, but by an independent source and RTÉ. Following the arrest, without naming FitzPatrick, the Minister for Finance Brian Lenihan commented on the situation. After more than 24 hours of questioning, he was released without charge on 19 March 2010. A file was prepared for the Director of Public Prosecutions.

FitzPatrick was arrested by Gardaí on Friday 9 December 2011 and 24 July 2011 as part of an investigation into "Financial Irregularities at a Financial Institution". He was charged with 16 offences by Gardaí attached to the Office of the Director of Corporate Enforcement relating to his role in advising on and lending millions to a golden circle of investors to inflate, falsely, Anglo's share price.

After the ODCE's investigation methods were found to be flawed, on 23 May 2017 the judge in FitzPatrick's trial directed that he be acquitted of all charges.

=== Irish Life and Permanent transaction 2008 ===
In 2010, a report by John Purcell, a special investigator, stated that FitzPatrick, David Drumm, and former Anglo Irish Bank finance director Willie McAteer and Peter Fitzpatrick, former director of finance at Irish Life and Permanent had 'prima facie' cases to answer in relation to their roles in dealings at Anglo Irish Bank and transactions to Irish Life and Permanent. Purcell submitted his report to the Complaints Committee of the Chartered Accountants Regulatory Board on 14 December 2010, and forwarded to the board's Disciplinary Committee. FitzPatrick was disbarred as a Chartered Accountant in 2019.

== Bankruptcy and death ==
FitzPatrick was declared bankrupt by the Irish High Court on 12 July 2010.

Seán FitzPatrick died on 8 November 2021 after a short illness. He was 73.

== See also ==
- Post-2008 Irish economic downturn
- Irish property bubble
- Michael Fingleton
