= Seán Quinn =

Irish businessman (born 1946)

- Born: John Ignatius Quinn; 3 September 1946 (age 80); Derrylin, County Fermanagh, Northern Ireland
- Occupation: Businessman
- Spouse: Patricia Quinn
- Children: 5

John Ignatius Quinn, commonly known as Seán Quinn (born 3 September 1946), is an Irish businessman and conglomerateur. In 2008 he was the richest person in the Republic of Ireland, but in 2012 he was declared bankrupt.

The Sunday Times Rich List in 2008 estimated his personal worth to be €4.722 billion or £3.73 billion, thereby making him the richest person in Ireland. Forbes magazine's 2008 Rich List listed him again as the richest person in Ireland, in 164th place amongst the wealthiest individuals in the world. His net worth, as of February 2008, was estimated at $6.0 billion, approximately £3.084 billion.

In November 2005 the Quinn Group, which was then privately owned by the Quinn family, was elsewhere estimated to be worth between €4 billion and €5 billion. In 2007 the group made a pre-tax profit of £439m. In April 2011 Kieran Wallace of KPMG was appointed as share receiver to Anglo Irish Bank (to which the Quinn Group owe over €2.8 billion) and took control of the Quinn family's equity interest in Quinn Group. Sean Quinn and the Quinn family no longer have any role in the management, operations or ownership of the Quinn Group. Quinn was declared bankrupt on 11 November 2011 in Northern Ireland; this was annulled on appeal but he was declared bankrupt in the Republic of Ireland on 16 January 2012. He did not oppose the application. He owed over €2 billion to the Irish Bank Resolution Corporation.

Quinn was sentenced at the High Court in Dublin on 2 November 2012 to nine weeks in jail, due to contempt of court. Quinn's son-in-law, Niall McPartland, successfully used "right to be forgotten" legislation to remove articles from internet search listings that highlighted their lavish lifestyle before becoming bankrupt, along with key parts of Quinn's bankruptcy.

== Irish business ==
=== Foundation and early years ===
Quinn took over the family farm in late 1967, after the passing of his father, Hugh, who had bought it for £2,000. A number of other local farmers had excavated gravel in the 1950s and 1960s—the land, while being agriculturally poor, was mineral rich. Farming had not made the family much money and Quinn did not particularly enjoy it.

In an interview with Ireland's Sunday Business Post, Quinn attributed his initial success to the contacts he developed through the Gaelic Athletic Association (GAA). These contacts enabled him to build a company spanning both sides of the Irish border when, in 1973, he borrowed £100 and started extracting gravel from his family 23-acre (93,000 m^{2}) farm, washing it and selling it to local builders. The company was called Seán Quinn Quarries Ltd. From this came Quinn Cement, the basis of his wealth. In recent years Quinn diversified with his Quinn Group playing a leading role in Ireland's hospitality industry, setting up Quinn Hotels. The centrepiece hotel was the Slieve Russell Hotel in Ballyconnell, County Cavan. He maintains interests in Ireland's glass, radiator and plastics industries with Quinn Glass, based in Fermanagh, and Quinn Lite Pac, based in County Longford. As of 2009, the Quinn Group employed more than 5,500 people throughout Ireland.

Quinn Financial Services, founded in 1996, includes the Quinn Direct insurance business. With its headquarters in Cavan, it made €123 million profit in the first six months of 2006 (up 38% on the previous year), on sales of €386 million between January and June 2006.

In January 2007 the Quinn Group purchased Ireland's second biggest health insurance provider, Bupa Ireland, for €150 million in a deal that saved BUPA from leaving Ireland's health insurance industry. In the same month Quinn increased his share holding in the Anglo Irish Bank to approximately 5%, for an equivalent value of €570 million – financed through the group's equity and through a deal with the Swiss-based giant Credit Suisse.

Throughout 2007 peaking in July 2008 Quinn increased his family's stake to 15% in Anglo Irish Bank. The bank along with all financial institutions in Ireland saw its share price collapse in the latter half of 2008, and on 15 January 2009 the Irish government announced it had taken control of the bank. Shares were trading for as little as 22c (from a high of €17 in May 2007) before the takeover.

== Recession of 2008 ==
Forbes Rich List had estimated that the Quinn family's net worth took a major hit in 2008–09, with Denis O'Brien replacing Quinn as Ireland's wealthiest person.

=== Anglo-Irish Bank investment ===
A large part of the subsequent loss can be linked to the well-publicised near collapse of the Anglo Irish Bank, which wiped out at least €2.8 billion of the family's wealth. Between October 2005 and July 2007 Quinn built up a 28% stake in the bank, mainly through contracts for difference, a financial instrument used to acquire the rights, risks and potential returns of a share price. Quinn admitted at the time in an RTÉ Prime Time interview that it had "set the company back 2 to 3 years".

In 2008 the shares or contracts for difference bought in Anglo Irish Bank dropped in value and the bank had to find a buyer for Quinn's shares. A group of clients known as the "Golden Circle" bought the shares, and, controversially (and illegally), the bank lent them €451 million to buy them. The €451 million was never repaid as the Anglo Irish Bank hidden loans controversy emerged, following which the bank was nationalised in 2009.

=== Quinn Insurance ===
In 2008, Quinn Insurance was levied a record €3.25 million fine from the Financial Regulator in the Republic of Ireland with Quinn personally being fined €200,000. These fines were related to loans issued from Quinn Insurance to an associated company that he controlled. "These loans breached insurance regulations and as a result of this the Financial Regulator has sanctioned Quinn Insurance and myself. I accept complete responsibility for this breach of regulation." The fines arose from a failure to notify the regulator of a loan of €288 million from Quinn Insurance to other firms in his group. The cash was used by the Quinn family to cover falling stock market investments and finance share-buying in Anglo Irish Bank. On the back of the fines, Quinn stepped down from the board of Quinn Insurance and a number of other Quinn Group boards announcing plans to restructure the boards to reflect those of a public company. In March 2010 The High Court in Dublin ruled that Quinn Insurance should be placed into administration.

Quinn Insurance had made losses of €905m in 2009, and €160m in 2010, and the Irish Government passed the Insurance (Amendment ) Bill 2011 which imposed a 2% levy on all other Insurance policies to meet an estimated €280m shortfall to the state's Insurance Compensation Fund. Because part of the losses were caused by Quinn Insurance loans to fund speculative investments for other Quinn family companies, Clare Daly commented that – "A large percentage of insurance losses result from speculative gambling on the property market by the family and, in effect, the legislation provides for the transfer of those gambling debts on to the shoulders of hard pressed taxpayers and working people who need to insure cars, homes and so on." The cost to Irish policyholders will come to €65m annually over five years.

=== Liquidation litigation from 2010 ===
With Anglo Irish Bank's financial difficulties Quinn was pursued in 2010 for his loans from it, then about €2.8 billion secured on property worth much less. In April 2011 the loans were formally called, and an ongoing series of court cases are underway in several jurisdictions. In particular, his overseas holding company, Quinn Investments Sweden, was wound up in July 2011.

In July 2011 Anglo Irish Bank was renamed as the Irish Bank Resolution Corporation (IBRC).

It was found in late 2011 that some of the Swedish company's assets had been transferred to family-controlled companies in Cyprus, leading to a fresh round of litigation there. It was alleged by the liquidator that property owned in Russia worth $193m had been sold to a cousin, Peter Quinn, for $1,000 and a laptop computer. The Quinn family described the allegations as "baseless and hardly deserving of comment". Other property in Kyiv, Ukraine, that was 93% controlled from Sweden was the subject of further proceedings in December 2011.

Separately, Quinn's wife and children have started legal proceedings in Dublin in 2011 alleging that the €2.34 billion that he borrowed from Anglo-Irish Bank to buy the bank should not be repayable because the money was lent for the unlawful purpose of supporting the bank's share price. He has been joined as a third party in the case.

The Quinn Group liquidator's staff have said that since its liquidation in April 2011 an unusual amount of damage has been caused to the Quinn Group's property, and an executive's car was burnt out at his home.

On 11 November 2011, Quinn said that he had applied for voluntary bankruptcy in Belfast, and issued a statement asking the media to consider his views as well as the bank's. The case was filed under his legal name of John Ignatius Quinn, using an address in Northern Ireland, and he admitted debts of €194m. Within days the IBRC said it would challenge the Belfast application in the commercial court in Dublin, alleging that Quinn had only used a Republic of Ireland address in directors' filings for 95 companies and none in Northern Ireland (at the time, personal bankruptcies lasted for 12 years in the Republic, but only for 1 year in Northern Ireland).

However a check of the electoral register for County Cavan clearly showed Quinn registered as a resident of the Republic of Ireland, having a vote in all elections, obviously contradicting the evidence given to the Belfast Court that he was only resident in County Fermanagh.

On 10 January 2012 the High Court in Belfast annulled the Bankruptcy Order against Quinn, and later that day the High Court in Dublin agreed to expedite the hearing of a petition to render him bankrupt in the Republic of Ireland. He was declared bankrupt in the Republic of Ireland on 16 January 2012.

In July 2012, Seán Quinn, his son Seán Jr and Peter Darragh Quinn were served with around 30 coercive court orders intended to reverse asset-stripping measures, after courts had earlier found that all three acted in contempt of orders restraining asset-stripping. Seán Quinn was not jailed as the judge agreed to a request by IBRC that he remain free to secure compliance with the coercive orders. However, representatives of IBRC have complained that Seán Quinn Sr. has "done nothing to purge his contempt and reverse the asset stripping since the July 20th coercive orders were made". The bank was concerned that asset-stripping was still going on and that assets could be "irretrievably lost". Seán Quinn was sentenced by Ms Justice Elizabeth Dunne at the High Court in Dublin on 2 November 2012 to 9 weeks in jail, noting that "In my view he has only himself to blame."

Quinn was released from Mountjoy Prison on 3 January 2013, although he had been allowed to attend the christening of his granddaughter in December. On 24 January, a two-day cross-examination began in court of all five adult children of Quinn. The cross-examination was conducted by lawyers for IBRC and the goal was to establish whether the members of the Quinn family have complied with court orders to provide full details of their bank accounts and other assets. As it turned out, substantial sums of money had been paid by Russian subsidiaries of Quinn's real estate business to his children and other family members in 2011/12. For example, Colette Quinn received €340,000 after having allegedly signed a contract "without understanding it as it was in Russian" and having "had no documents indicating what work she was expected to do". She also admitted to being a director of "about eight Cypriot companies". Most of the money has allegedly since been spent, but no receipts were available to support that claim.

Since the government liquidated IBRC in February 2013, the Quinn family has been thinking about a legal challenge to the constitutionality of the IBRC act. This act put an immediate stay on all existing legal proceedings against IBRC, including one brought by the Quinn family which claims that they are not liable for a €2.34bn loan made to Quinn by Anglo Irish. A court hearing on the validity of the stay has been set for 7 March.

In July 2013 Mr Justice Peter Kelly of the High Court said that it was "simply incredible" to accept claims by five Quinn children and three of their spouses that they could not produce documents about their alleged employment by Russian companies. He said they had been paid "very large" sums that together came to nearly two million euro "in a very strange way". In a judgement he said that they had made "substandard" disclosure of documents and directed defendands (except Brenda Quinn – not employed by any company in IPG) to make fuller disclosures about their "highly lucrative" contracts of employment with IPG companies. The full hearing was then parked pending legal proceedings against some former executives of Anglo Irish Bank.

== Overseas business ==
The Quinn Group had expanded into the hospitality industry overseas, with hotels in the Czech Republic, United Kingdom, Bulgaria and Poland. The Quinn Group took control of the Prague Hilton, the largest five-star hotel in Prague, in 2004. It paid €145 million for the 788-room Hilton and the Ibis Karlin. The group also acquired the Hilton Hotel in Sofia, Bulgaria. In 2005 the group bought The De Vere Belfry hotel and golf course in England. In 2004 Quinn Direct insurance expanded into the UK motor and commercial insurance market. Quinn Direct Insurance sponsored the British Masters tournament there in May 2006.

On 7 March 2007, Quinn spoke publicly for the first time in 10 years at a conference at the Slieve Russell hotel organised by the Cavan County Enterprise Board, at which he outlined the strategic aims of the Quinn Group in the immediate future. As of April 2011 Quinn and the Quinn family no longer have any role in the management, operations or ownership of the Quinn Group.

The currently ongoing litigation about asset-stripping involves former properties of Quinn's in Ukraine and Russia. In Kyiv, the IBRC has been trying to establish control over the Univermag "Ukraina" mall – so far unsuccessfully. In fact, IBRC has hired Russian Alfa Group's asset recovery arm to enforce its claims. In Russia, IBRC is still struggling to establish its control over the Kutuzoff (or Kutuzov) Tower.

== Personal life ==
Quinn was born in Derrylin, County Fermanagh, near the border with County Cavan. In the 1960s, there was much poverty in the area and few diversions other than football, a pursuit at which Quinn spent much of his teenage years. He and his brother Peter played Gaelic football for Teemore Shamrocks. The team won the Fermanagh County Championship in 1969, the first for the club since 1935. The club won three more county titles in the 1970s, and Seán Quinn eventually captained the Fermanagh county team.

Peter became a financial advisor, and in 1990 he was elected President of the Gaelic Athletic Association (GAA), Ireland's largest sporting and cultural organisation, a position he held between 1991 and 1994.

The Quinn Group was also an important sponsor of Fermanagh GAA. Quinn's involvement in the GAA was, in the words of one commentator, "a constant theme throughout the group". In the words of one associate, "The GAA forms a big part of Seán's life. Aside from that, he drinks the occasional jar in pubs in Ballyconnell and enjoys the odd game of poker." Quinn also donated land to Kildallan GFC, which was used in the development of a training field.

On 18 May 1999, Quinn was awarded an Honorary Doctor of Laws from NUI Maynooth. He also holds an Honorary Doctorate from Queen's University Belfast (QUB).

Quinn is married to Patricia, and they have five children. His children – Seán Jnr, Colette, Ciara, Aoife and Brenda – all work in the family business. His son, Seán Jnr, lined out for the Fermanagh minor team. Collette Quinn was also director of BOUVERIE NO.1 LIMITED Ultimate Holding Company QUINN PROPERTY INVESTMENTS LIMITED, Shareholder funds -£87,531,000 – now in liquidation [creditsafe.uk]

In 2012, Quinn was jailed for three months for contempt of court, having allegedly engaged in asset stripping, e.g., by arranging a payment of US$500,000 to the general director of Quinn Properties Ukraine, just before losing control of the company. Quinn lives with his wife and family in Ballyconnell, Tullyhaw, County Cavan, next to his Slieve Russell Hotel and just down the road from his birthplace in Derrylin.
