= Steve Thatcher =

Insolvency Solicitor

Steve Thatcher is a personal insolvency solicitor. Based in Leicester, he is best known in the Republic of Ireland where he is a controversial figure due to his work helping Irish people move to the UK in order to go bankrupt there, a trend known as bankruptcy tourism. In May 2012 it was reported in The Guardian newspaper that he had written off over €1 billion of Irish debt in the UK. Though Thatcher dismisses the validity of the term 'bankruptcy tourism' and instead calls it 'bankruptcy emigration' as he says people have to emigrate to the UK in order to go bankrupt with the majority of his clients remaining in the UK once their bankruptcy is complete.

Thatcher has been a fervent critic of the reform of Ireland's personal insolvency laws, outlining that they do not go far enough and that laws there should be brought into line with the UK.

Steve following his illustrious career in law opened a pub in Leicester called Broood @ Vin Quatre. It in its two-year lifetime had over 1400 guest ales on. The pub sadly closed on 19 January 2019.
