= Corporate Enforcement Authority =

Irish governmental office

State Agency of the Department of Enterprise, Tourism and Employment overview
- Formed: July 2022
- Preceding State Agency of the Department of Enterprise, Tourism and Employment: Office of the Director of Corporate Enforcement
- Jurisdiction: Ireland
- Headquarters: 16 Parnell Square, Dublin 1, D01 W5C2
- State Agency of the Department of Enterprise, Tourism and Employment executive: Ian Drennan, Director of Corporate Enforcement
- Key document: Companies (Corporate Enforcement Authority) Act 2021
- Website: CEA website

The Corporate Enforcement Authority (CEA) is the competent authority in Ireland for the general promotion of compliance with the Companies Acts, the investigation of breaches of the Companies Acts and the taking of any necessary enforcement actions to ensure continued compliance.

The current director is Ian Drennan. His 80-person team comprises accountants, lawyers and detectives from the National Economic Crime Bureau (GNECB). He is legally responsible for:

- encouraging compliance with company law
- investigating and enforcing suspected breaches of the legislation
- bringing to account those who disregard the law

The director and his team operate on an independent basis with the aim of reducing personal and business risk and improving the overall standard of public compliance. The powers of the authority are set out in the Companies (Corporate Enforcement Authority) Act 2021 and has an annual operating budget of approximately €3 million. Many of the initiatives of the office are taken in the general public interest.

The authority operates alongside the Companies Registration Office (Ireland), which is responsible for the registration of companies, registering documentary filing and the enforcement of administrative breaches of company law.

== History ==
The Office of the Director of Corporate Enforcement was originally established in November 2001 as a consequence of the proceedings and the conclusions of various review groups, courts, tribunals of inquiry and parliamentary committees in recent years. These have revealed evidence that provisions in Irish company law and other legislation have been regularly breached and that some entities and individuals have not been called to account. The result is that various parties, e.g., the State, other businesses and consumers, have borne the cost of this misbehaviour and the associated business risks. Following a fundamental review, the Irish Government determined inter-alia that there were insufficient resources and legal instruments available to the State to supervise and enforce adherence to the requirements of company law and that it was necessary to correct these deficiencies in the public interest.

== "Toxic Culture" ==
In 2025, the CEA came under scrutiny following multiple media reports alleging a toxic workplace culture within the agency. The reports highlighted high staff turnover, which has significantly hindered major white-collar crime investigations, including one involving the FAI and its former CEO John Delaney.

In response to the allegations, the CEA announced plans to conduct a cultural audit as part of its 2026–2028 strategy.

== Compliance role ==
The director seeks to foster compliance with the law and the consequences of non-compliance through presentations, public communication, consultation with professional bodies and engagement with all branches of government that facilitate compliance.

== Enforcement role ==
The investigative and enforcement role is quite extensive and encompasses:

- the initiation of fact-finding company investigations. There were 2,111 new cases in 2005 (1,577 in 2004)
- prosecutions related to breaches of company law. There were 69 legal proceedings in 2005 (61 in 2004)
- the supervision of companies in liquidation or insolvent
- the supervision of liquidators and receivers
- the regulation of undischarged bankrupts acting as company officers

== See also ==
- European corporate law (EU)
- Financial Conduct Authority (UK)
