= Patrick Neary (regulator) =

Irish civil servant

Patrick Neary, an Irish accountant and public servant, was Financial Regulator at the time of Ireland's financial crisis in 2008, including the issuance of a State guarantee for the country's major banks. His role in the crisis has been subject to significant criticism.

== Early life ==
Patrick Neary came from County Kilkenny, and studied at St Kieran's College, Kilkenny. He attended University College Dublin for one year, studying the Classics, leaving to help in his family's horticultural business. He subsequently joined the Central Bank of Ireland in 1971.

== Career ==
Neary began in the Central Bank in a junior role, and was promoted over three decades, reaching a position as head of supervision for securities and stock exchanges. Cases he worked on included two of three Irish bank collapses prior to the Anglo-Irish Bank crisis - those of Irish Trust Bank in 1976 and Merchant Banking in 1982 - and that of Bank of Ireland acquisition First New Hampshire Bank.

In 2003, he moved from the main body of the Central Bank to take one of the leadership positions, as prudential director, at a new semi-separate supervisory agency for Ireland's financial institutions, the Irish Financial Services Regulatory Authority (IFSRA). The IFSRA, while under the auspices of the Central Bank, had its own management structures, and a high degree of operational independence. While prudential director, Neary oversaw work on two cases concerning scandals at AIB.

In February 2006, Neary was appointed as CEO of the IFSRA, making him the leading regulator of financial institutions in Ireland, supervising more than 10,000 bodies and funds, with assets in excess of over 1.1 trillion euro. In 2009, there were criticisms of the authority's work "stress-testing" Irish banks, and the weight placed on bad debt risk on property loans, as well as loans from key players in Anglo-Irish Bank.

At a public appearance before the country's parliamentary enquiry into banking in 2015, Neary confirmed that he told Taoiseach Brian Cowen that all the country's banks were solvent on the night of 29 September 2008, when those same banks were provided with a substantial guarantee by the country's politicians. He did note that one bank, Anglo-Irish, had been under pressure around solvency, and accepted that, with hindsight, more could have been done from a regulatory standpoint. Economist David McWilliams has described Neary as "the worst financial regulator the world has ever seen." At the 2015 enquiry, Neary also admitted it was a mistake to print golf balls featuring the Regulator's logo.
