= Official assignee =

An official assignee is an officer in the law court who distributes a bankrupt's assets to the creditors. He also assists the bankrupt to relieve of his obligations to the creditors.

Under the bankruptcy system operating in the United Kingdom before 1869, such officers were appointed by the Lord Chancellor, accountants or from the commercial world.
