= Irish Bank Resolution Corporation =

- Predecessor: Anglo Irish Bank
- Founded: 1 July 2011
- Defunct: 7 February 2013
- Fate: Placed into liquidation overnight by emergency legislation
- Headquarters: Ireland
- Key people: Alan Dukes (Chairman), Mike Aynsley (Group CEO)
- Owner: State of Ireland
- Number of employees: ▼0 (7 February 2013); 850 (6 February 2013)
- Website: www.ibrc.ie

The Irish Bank Resolution Corporation (IBRC) was the name given to the entity formed in 2011 by the court-mandated merger of the state-owned banking institutions Anglo Irish Bank and Irish Nationwide Building Society.

Following a High Court order on the application of the Minister for Finance, Michael Noonan, the Irish government drove through overnight legislation to liquidate the IBRC in February 2013, with the emergency action required given a leaking of plans in the press.

== History ==
Irish Nationwide Building Society (INBS) had been effectively nationalised in August 2010, after receiving a €5.4bn government bailout., while Anglo Irish Bank had been taken into state ownership in January 2009. The two institutions had been widely criticised for their role in the risky lending practices that led to the Irish banking crisis.

The removal of both failed banks from the Irish banking system was a key objective for the new Fine Gael-led government. Michael Noonan, the Minister for Finance, made an application to the High Court using his powers under the Credit Institutions (Stabilization) Act 2010, requesting that the assets and liabilities of INBS be immediately transferred to Anglo Irish Bank.

The newly merged entity was named the Irish Bank Resolution Corporation. The Finance Minister stated that the new name was important to remove the "negative international references associated with the appalling failings of both institutions and their previous managements".

== Liquidation ==
On 6 February 2013, the board of the IBRC was stood down by the Irish government and replaced by Kieran Wallace and Eamonn Richardson of accountancy group KPMG as Special Liquidators. Michael Noonan introduced emergency legislation to liquidate IBRC, and replace its promissory notes with bonds with an average maturity of 27 years. Dáil Éireann began debating the legislation a few minutes after midnight on 7 February.

Opposition politicians reacted with instant universal dismay and condemnation of the Fine Gael-Labour coalition's actions and the driving through of legislation during the night. Independent TD John Halligan deemed the legislation "madness", with People Before Profit Alliance TD Richard Boyd Barrett protesting "Only 2 hours 15 mins to read & vote with no details of broader deal in Europe"—both comments made on Twitter. Independent TD Shane Ross called the showdown a "humiliation" and expressed particular concern about Section 17 of the Bill, which awards wide-ranging powers to the finance minister, while his fellow Independent TD Stephen Donnelly suggested it was "entirely plausible" that Section 17 is unconstitutional. Socialist Party TD Joe Higgins described the rapid developments as "chaotic". Finance Minister Noonan also made reference to the hundreds of people who were effectively sacked on live television; according to Sinn Féin finance spokesperson Pearse Doherty the workers found out from Bloomberg Television that they had lost their jobs.

== Commission of investigation ==
In 2015, the government proposed a motion in the Oireachtas to establish a commission of investigation into the operation of IBRC. On 10 June 2015, it was announced that Mr Justice Daniel O'Keeffe had agreed to serve as Chairperson of the Commission of Investigation.

== See also ==
- Bank resolution
