= Anglo Irish Bank =

Former Irish based bank

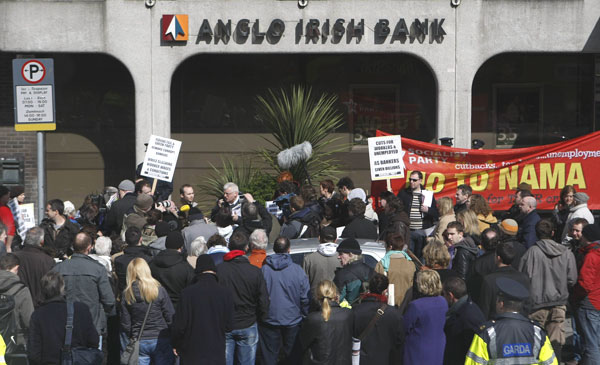
- Former headquarters at St Stephen's Green, Dublin
- Type: State-owned
- Founded: 1964
- Defunct: 1 July 2011
- Headquarters: Dublin, Ireland
- Key people: Seán FitzPatrick (former chairman), Alan Dukes (post-nationalisation chairman), Mike Aynsley (post-nationalisation group CEO)
- Number of employees: 0 (July 2011); 1500 (2006)
- Website: www.ibrc.ie

Anglo Irish Bank was an Irish bank headquartered in Dublin from 1964 to 2011. It began to wind down after nationalisation in 2009. In July 2011 Anglo Irish merged with the Irish Nationwide Building Society, forming a new company named the Irish Bank Resolution Corporation. Michael Noonan, the Minister for Finance stated that the name change was important in order to remove "the negative international references associated with the appalling failings of both institutions and their previous managements".

Anglo Irish mainly dealt in business and commercial banking, and had only a limited retail presence in the major Irish cities. It also had wealth management and treasury divisions. Anglo Irish had operations in Austria, Switzerland, the Isle of Man, the United Kingdom, and the United States.

The bank's heavy exposure to property lending, with most of its loan book being to builders and property developers, meant that it was badly affected by the downturn in the Irish property market in 2008. In December 2008, the Irish government announced plans to inject €1.5 billion of capital for a 75% stake in the bank, effectively nationalising it. The Dublin and London Stock Exchanges immediately suspended trading in Anglo Irish's shares, with the final closing share price of €0.22 representing a fall of over 98% from its peak.

On 16 January 2009 the then Taoiseach Brian Cowen stated that it was "business as usual" at Anglo Irish Bank, and people should be reassured that the bank is solvent. Between June and September 2009, the Minister for Finance provided €4 billion in capital. In a statement on 30 March 2010, a day before Anglo Irish Bank reported its financial results, the Minister of Finance Brian Lenihan announced an injection of €8.3 billion into the bank, noting that a further €10 billion may be required at a later stage to cover future losses and ensure an adequate capital base.

Since the nationalization of Anglo Irish Bank a number of controversies have arisen over certain business practices and loans, including loans to directors and loans to people associated with Brendan Murtagh, EMPG, and the QUINN group.

On 31 March 2010 Anglo Irish Bank reported results for the 15 months to December 2009. Losses for the period were €12.7 billion, with an operating profit before impairment of €2.4 billion and an impairment charges of €15.1 billion driving the overall result. It is the largest loss in Irish corporate history. Total assets declined to €85.2 billion at the end of 2009 from €101.3 billion in September 2008.

The European Commission allowed the Irish government on 10 August 2010 to temporarily grant €10 billion to Anglo Irish Bank – this included an additional €1.4 billion sought by Ireland to allow the nationalised bank meet its regulatory capital requirements in light of increased costs associated with transferring loans to the National Asset Management Agency.

In 2011 the accounts for UK savers were moved to the Allied Irish Bank (GB).

== Nationalisation ==
On 15 January 2009, the Government announced that it would take steps that would enable the Bank to be taken into State ownership. The Anglo Irish Bank Corporation Act, 2009 provided for the transfer of all the shares of the Bank to the Minister for Finance and was enacted under Irish law on 21 January 2009. On the same date, the Bank was re-registered as a private limited company.

In order to protect the capital position of the Bank the Minister for Finance provided €4 billion in capital between June and September 2009. A liability management exercise was also undertaken in August 2009 and €1.8 billion of equity was realised on the buyback, at a significant discount, of subordinated debt instruments. In December 2009, the Minister committed to safeguard the Bank's regulatory capital position. As a result, the Minister issued of a promissory note for €8.3 billion on 31 March 2010, bringing the government's investment in Anglo Irish bank to €12.3 billion. Since then the notes have risen in value to cover €30.6 billion of the €34.7 billion cost of Anglo Irish Bank and Irish Nationwide Bank (€25.3 billion of the €29.3 billion cost of Anglo and €5.3 billion of INBS's €5.4 billion cost).

In his statement to the Dáil Éireann on 30 March 2010, the Minister for Finance stated: "Finding a long-term solution for Anglo Irish Bank is by far the biggest challenge in resolving the banking crisis. The sheer size of the bank means there are no easy or low cost options. Winding-up the bank is not and was never a viable option."

In September 2010, the government announced that it would separate the bank into two entities, an "asset recovery bank" to manage existing loans, and a separate "funding bank" holding deposits.

=== Anglo Irish Bank Austria (AIBA) Sale ===
On 5 September 2008, a few months before being nationalized, Anglo Irish sold its Anglo Irish Bank Austria (AIBA) division to Valartis Bank.

=== Anglo & INBS Merger ===
A Transfer Order was made by the High Court in Dublin under the Credit Institutions (Stabilisation) Act 2010 transferring the assets and liabilities of Irish Nationwide Building Society ("INBS") to Anglo Irish Bank Corporation Limited ("Anglo" or the "Bank") on 1 July 2011. This achieves the legal merger of the INBS business into Anglo consistent with directions provided to both entities by the Minister for Finance, in consultation with the European Commission.

== Financial results ==
On 31 March 2010, Anglo Irish Bank reported results for the 15 months to December 2009. Loss for the period were €12.7 billion, with an operating profit before impairment of €2.4 billion and an impairment charges of €15.1 billion driving the overall result. Total assets declined to €85.2 billion at the end of 2009 from €101.3 billion in September 2008.

With the substantial capital investment in the Bank by the government offsetting the provisions, the Core Tier 1 and total regulatory capital were €5 billion and €8 billion respectively at the end of 2009 versus risk weighted assets of €73 billion.

Anglo Irish Bank is the largest contributor of assets to Ireland's "bad bank", the National Asset Management Agency. It expects to transfer loans with a nominal value of €35.6 billion to NAMA over 2010 which would see the risk-weighted-assets fall to €43 billion.

In Anglo Irish Bank's 2009 Annual Report, referring to the QUINN group and related companies, it stated that the "High Court in Ireland appointed two joint provisional administrators to a significant corporate borrower of the Group. The Group is closely monitoring the situation and assessing the potential implications of this development which may have a negative impact on impairment charges in 2010."

== Controversy of business practices & loans ==
On 4 April 2010, The Times described the lending practices at Anglo Irish Bank and how these led to the nationalisation of the bank. The article quotes the new CEO, Mike Aynsley: "hubris played a very, very big part." In many deals, Anglo Irish Bank would lend to wealthy individuals to further their equity participation. According to the CEO of Ireland's the National Asset Management Agency (NAMA), loan-to-value on deals was as high as 100%. As a result, the bank was totally exposed to any decline in value. In many cases, Anglo took personal guarantees as security. However, NAMA attaches no value to these personal guarantees.

Of the €36.5 billion of loans not being transferred to NAMA, Anglo Irish Bank has taken a provision of €4.9 billion. The article in The Times notes that Anglo Irish Bank has large exposures to entrepreneurs such as Seán Quinn of Quinn Group and Barry O’Callaghan, of EMPG. In both cases, the bank's security was limited and largely on the men's shares in businesses. The provision of €4.9 billion compares with impaired loans of €9.5 billion at the end of December 2009.

=== Loans to directors scandal ===
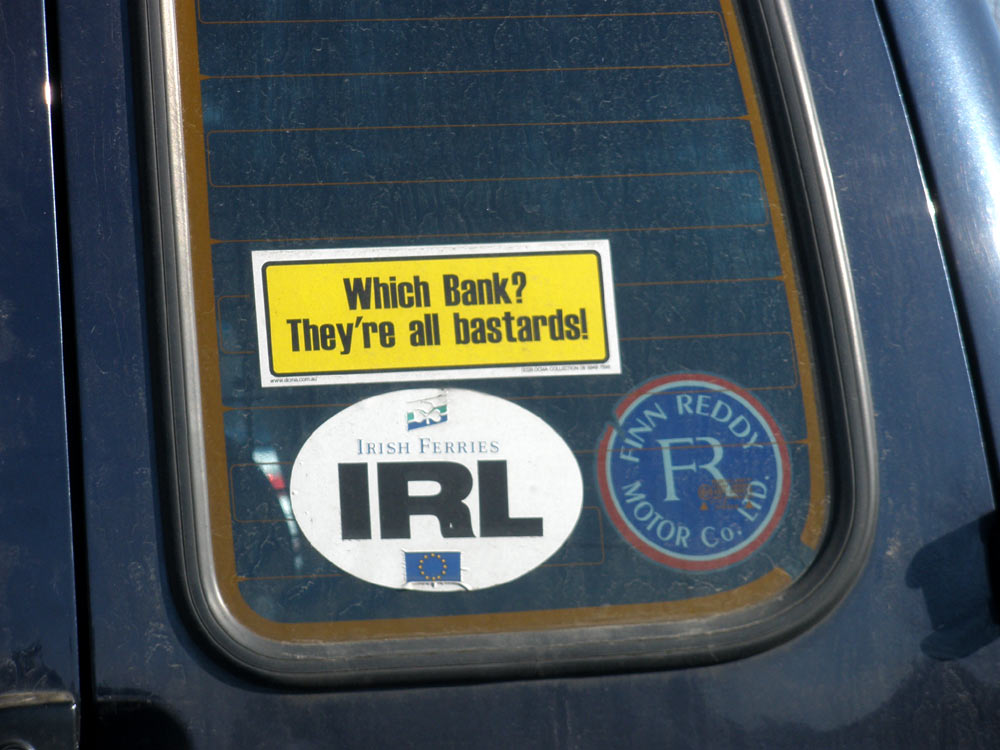
Sticker on van window reacts to financial crisis

Chairman Seán FitzPatrick, CEO David Drumm, and board member Lars Bradshaw resigned in December 2008, following the revelation of a loan scandal. FitzPatrick and Bradshaw had taken out loans in order to purchase Anglo Irish shares. From 2000 to 2008, FitzPatrick transferred the loans to another bank prior to year-end audits, thereby causing "Loans to Directors" to be understated. In 2008, the loan to FitzPatrick and Bradshaw amounted to €87 million; the transfer resulted in the accounts showing only about €40 million outstanding to directors, instead of €150 million. The Central Bank of Ireland revealed that they became aware of problems surrounding loans from Anglo Irish Bank to FitzPatrick, following an inspection earlier in 2008. The regulator said, "While it does not appear that anything illegal took place in relation to these loans, the Central Bank of Ireland was of the view that the practices surrounding these loans were not appropriate. As a result, we continued to monitor and investigate this and as part of this process we advised Anglo-Irish Bank to ensure that these loans are reported in the annual accounts for 2008." The Financial Regulator resigned in January 2009 under pressure to do so.

In February 2009, Gardaí from the Bureau of Fraud Investigation raided the offices of Anglo Irish Bank.

In Anglo Irish Bank's 2009 Annual Report it lists loans to former directors totalling €155.8 million at the end of December 2009 versus €178.7 million at the end of September 2008. Whereas no provisions for impairment had been taken in September 2008, in the 2009 annual report, an impairment charge of €108.9 million was reported, implying a potential loss of 70% of the value of the loans to former directors.

However, the total loans to directors, former directors and "connected persons" was reported to be significantly higher at €255 million in the notes of the annual report.

=== Mainland Ventures ===
As of November 2009, twenty-one major, Irish investors are suing Anglo and its Delaware subsidiary, Mainland Ventures Corporation, for US$23 million due to "fraudulent and/or reckless concealment" perpetrated in regards to a hotel investment fund. The outcome is pending.

=== EMPG loans ===
On 13 January 2009, opposition party TD George Lee highlighted the potential exposure of the Irish taxpayer to the failure of Education Media and Publishing Group, the holding company of Houghton Mifflin Harcourt, given loans by Anglo Irish Bank to investors in EMPG. George Lee, TD for Dublin South, told journalists that EMPG, the parent company for US publisher Houghton Mifflin Harcourt, has failed with equity investors likely to be wiped out. The Irish taxpayer was exposed since Anglo Irish Bank had loans outstanding to the shareholders of EMPG.

George Lee commented:

It has been reported to me that the education materials company Houghton Mifflin Harcourt has failed, and that a number of Irish equity investors have lost significant sums of money as a result. Many of these investors were funded through large loans from Anglo Irish Bank, which is now wholly owned by Irish taxpayers.

As a company, Houghton Mifflin Harcourt was a highly leveraged operation and had very significant banking commitments. I understand that the remaining US business is to be transferred to its bond holders. However, it appears that its Irish equity investors will lose all of their investment as a result of this failure. This will have repercussions for Anglo Irish Bank, and possibly other Irish banks, and therefore the Irish taxpayer.

This incident adds further weight to Fine Gael's calls for an urgent investigation into the Irish banking crisis. Fuller details of the goings-on within Anglo Irish Bank's risky lending practices are still emerging, and this development with Houghton Mifflin Harcourt sheds further light. However, only a full, forensic investigation into the crisis will ensure that it never happens again.

Interviewed on Irish State broadcaster, RTÉ, Barry O'Callaghan, Chairman of EMPG and CEO of Houghton Mifflin Harcourt, confirmed that Irish investors as well as he himself were facing huge losses. He stated that "no-one has lost more than me".

According to the Irish Times, investors of Davy Stockbrokers had US$475 million of equity in EMPG. The article did not identify how much or any of this investment was backed by Anglo Irish Bank loans. According to the Irish Independent, Barry O'Callaghan is a large personal customer of Anglo Irish Bank. The Irish Independent article noted that former Anglo Irish Bank Chairman, Seán FitzPatrick is one of the Davy clients that had invested in EMPG.

Based on an analysis of the Irish Independent's "2008 Rich List" and The Sunday Times' "2009 Rich List", Barry O'Callaghan's personal debts in March 2008 were circa US$400 million.

On 15 January 2010, O'Callaghan admitted to having multimillion loans from Anglo Irish Bank and other international banks. Refusing to confirm the level of his indebtedness, O'Callaghan claimed to still be solvent and stated that he expects to honour all his obligations.

In contrast to the statement of George Lee that Irish taxpayers were exposed, an Anglo Irish Bank spokesperson was reported by the Irish Times to have stated that it did not have a "big exposure" to EMPG. However, the spokesperson did not comment on whether it had exposure to individuals who had exposure to EMPG.

=== Loans to Seán Quinn & the Quinn Group ===
On 30 March 2010, following an application by Ireland's Financial Regulator, the High Court appointed joint provisional administrators to Quinn Insurance Limited. According to the Irish Independent, eight subsidiaries of Quinn Insurance provided guarantees of €1.2bn to cover Quinn Group's debts, prompting the regulator to seek the appointment of provisional administrators in the High Court. In total the Quinn family is estimated to have €2.8 billion of loans from Anglo Irish Bank and the Quinn group has an additional €1.2 billion of loans. Of these circa €780 million need to be re-financed this year.

Given the magnitude of the loans to Anglo Irish Bank the company was reported to be considering a €700 million financial rescue of the Quinn group. The plan, would see €150 million injected into Quinn Insurance and €550 million would be used to pay off bondholders. Anglo Irish Bank would become the majority shareholder in the Quinn Group. This would be, in effect, a hostile takeover and as it will be done by a government agency – the nationalization of a private company by fiat.

The Quinn group has taken action to counter the moves by the Financial Regulator including the mobilisation of its employees into street protests. The Group furthermore has rejected press speculation that the Group needs €700m of financing. Instead the Group estimates that a cash injection of between €100m and €150m is required. refusing to speculate on the need for a €550 million payment to bondholders, it noted that a re-financing, if it occurred, would not necessarily increase the overall debt of the Group.

On 12 April 2010, the Financial Regulator and Quinn group were due in the High Court. The decision on a permanent appointment of administrators was postponed by one week, following a last minute submission of documents by the Quinn Group. The company pledged to work hard to seek a resolution to the uncertainty created by the appointment of provisional administrators to Quinn Insurance. On 15 April 2010, the Irish Times reported that Quinn Insurance decided not to fight the appointment of a permanent administrator.

== History ==
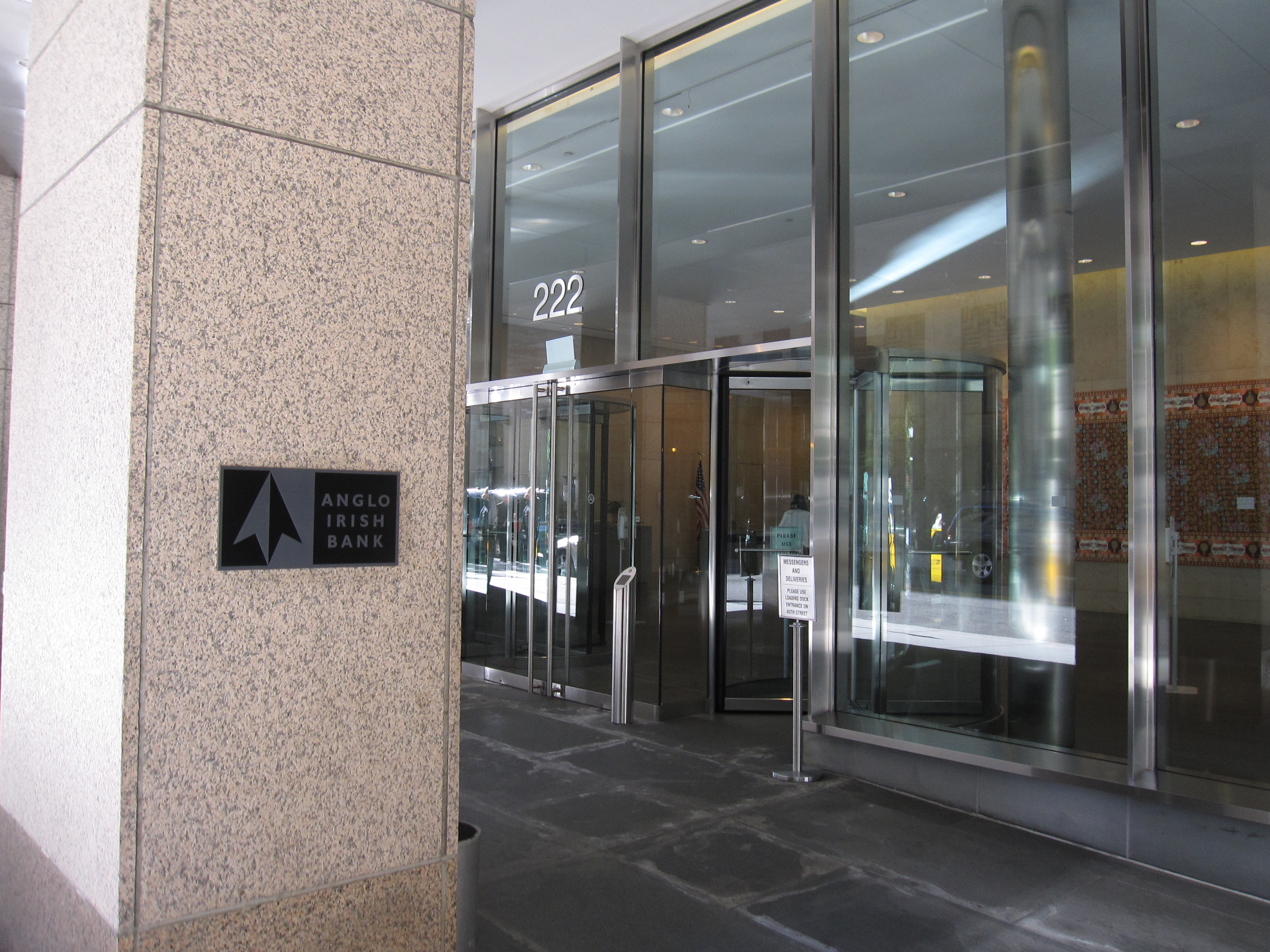
Anglo Irish Bank branch in New York's Midtown

- 1964 – Anglo Irish Bank was established in Dublin.
- 1971 – Anglo Irish listed on the stock exchange.
- 1978 – Anglo Irish bought by City of Dublin Bank.
- 1986 – City of Dublin Bank changed its name to Anglo-Irish Bank Corporation.
- 1988 – Anglo Irish acquired Irish Bank of Commerce.
- 1995 – Anglo Irish acquired Royal Trust Bank (Austria), a bank with a 100-year history, from Royal Bank of Canada and renamed it Anglo Irish Bank (Austria). Anglo Irish also acquired a loan portfolio from Allied Dunbar.
- 1996 – Anglo Irish acquired Ansbacher Bankers, which was established in Dublin in 1950.
- 1998 – Anglo Irish acquired Crédit Lyonnais (Austria) and combined it with its existing Austrian operations.
- 1999 – Anglo Irish acquired Smurfit Paribas Bank, a joint-venture that Banque Paribas had helped establish in Dublin in 1983. Anglo Irish also bought a loan portfolio from Bayerische Hypo- und Vereinsbank.
- 2001 – Anglo Irish acquired Banque Marcuard Cook & Cie. in Geneva, Switzerland, and renamed it Anglo Irish Bank (Suisse).
- 2005 – Chief Executive Seán FitzPatrick stepped down to assume the role of chairman. David Drumm replaced him as CEO.
- 2007 – In January, it was reported that Seán Quinn bought a 5% stake of Anglo Irish Bank for US$750 million. In July 2008 Quinn converted investments in the bank to ordinary shares, increasing his family's stake to 15%.
- 2007- Later in the same January, consultants Oliver Wyman named Anglo Irish Bank as the best-performing bank in the world over the past five years in a piece of research published to coincide with the World Economic Forum in Davos, Switzerland.
- 2008 – In September, Anglo Irish sells Anglo Irish Bank Austria (AIBA) to Swiss bank: Valartis Bank A.G.
- 2008 – In December, both FitzPatrick, the chairman, and Drumm, the CEO, resigned (see above).
- 2009 – Merrill Lynch, after receiving a fee of over US$11 million, said that the bank was "financially sound", 11 days before nationalisation.
- 2009 – The Irish Government nationalised Anglo Irish Bank at which point the Irish Stock Exchange and the London Stock Exchange delisted the bank. On 19 January the Board of Directors resigned to allow the Government to appoint a new board.
- 7 September 2009 – Mike Aynsley appointed as new Group Chief Executive.
- 2010 – Alan Dukes appointed Chairman
- 18 March 2010 – Former chairman Seán FitzPatrick is arrested for fraud.
- 31 March 2010 – At €12.7 billion, Anglo posts the largest loss in Irish corporate history.
- 2 June 2010 – Irish Minister of Finance, Brian Lenihan, announced a €2bn cash injection for Anglo Irish Bank.
- 8 September 2010 – Lenihan announced the separation into two entities.
- 30 September 2010 – the Irish Government announces a total estimate of the eventual cost of the Anglo Irish bailout as at least €29.3 billion, while also announcing that two other banks, AIB and Irish Nationwide, will require additional funding
- 31 March 2011 – For the year 2010 Anglo Irish Bank announced a €17.7 billion loss, breaking its own record for the highest corporate loss in Irish history.
- 20 April 2011 – Anglo Irish Bank signage removed from all the Bank's buildings across the world in a coordinated effort.
- 14 October 2011 – Anglo Irish Bank officially changed its name to Irish Bank Resolution Corporation Limited
- 26 January 2012 – The High Court was told a total of 11 Gardaí are investigating the sinister goings-on at Anglo: Mr Justice Peter Kelly found it "extraordinary" that more police were not involved.
- 24 June 2013 – The Irish Independent newspaper released "secret recordings" which contained recorded telephone conversations between senior manager John Bowe, who had been involved in negotiations with the Central Bank (of Ireland), laughing and joking as he tells another senior manager, Peter Fitzgerald, how Anglo was luring the State into giving it billions of euros.

== See also ==
- List of companies of Ireland
- List of banks in the Republic of Ireland
