= Post-2008 Irish banking crisis =

Post-2008 Irish economic downturn

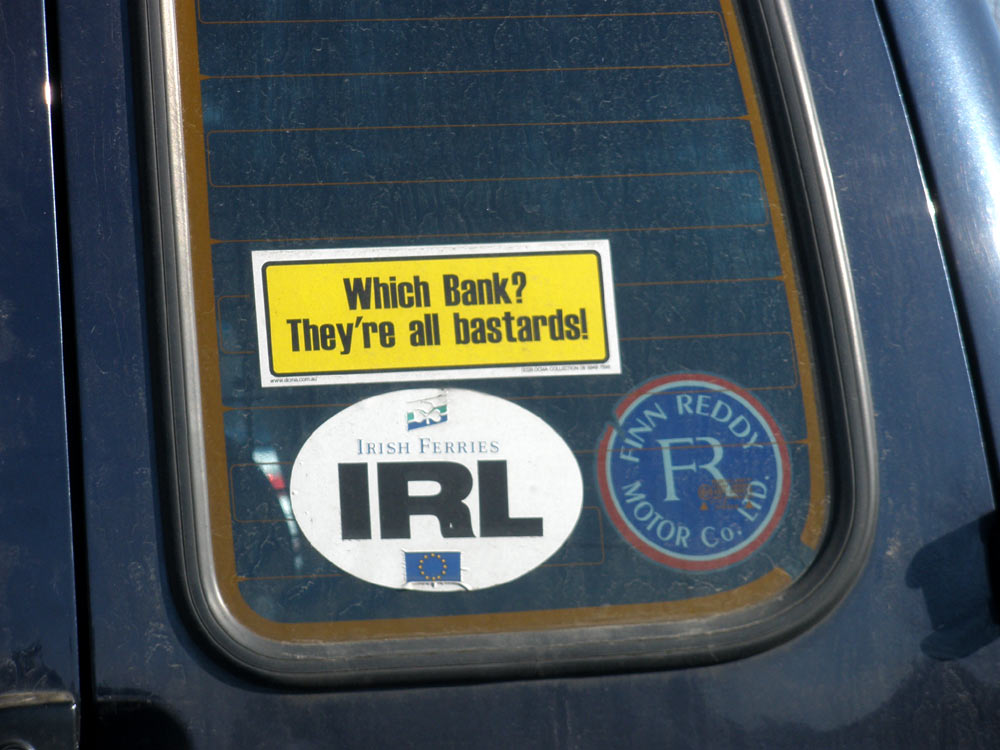
Sticker on van window in Dublin reacting to banking crisis

The post-2008 Irish banking crisis occurred when a number of Irish financial institutions faced almost imminent collapse due to insolvency during the Great Recession. In response, the Irish government instigated a €64 billion bank bailout. This then led to a number of unexpected revelations about the business affairs of some banks and business people. Ultimately, added onto the deepening recession in the country, the banks' bailout was the primary reason for the Irish government requiring IMF assistance and a total restructuring of the government occurred as result.

== Background ==
During the second half of the 1995–2007 'Celtic Tiger' period of growth, the international bond borrowings of the six main Irish banks—Bank of Ireland, Allied Irish Banks, Anglo Irish Bank, Irish Life & Permanent, Irish Nationwide Building Society and Educational Building Society—grew from less than €16 billion in 2003 to approximately €100 billion (well over half of Ireland's GDP) by 2007.

This growth in bond funding was quite exceptional relative to the aggregate euro area; the focus of the Central Bank of Ireland and most external observers had been on the apparently strong capital adequacy ratios of the banks or Pillar One of the Basel framework. For example, the 2007 International Monetary Fund Article IV Consultation—Staff Report on Ireland has a heading summarizing the position of the banking sector as "Banks Have Large Exposures to Property, But Big Cushions Too.". However, this appears to have come at the expense of a lack of emphasis on the second pillar, which relates to the supervisory process. In particular, the Basel II guidelines contain an extensive section on the importance of dealing with "credit concentration risk", i.e. banks having too much exposure to one source of risk. Inadequate and/or lax supervision of the Irish banking system had allowed excessive borrowing by the Irish Banks on the corporate and international money markets.

By October 2009 it was German and French banks that were most exposed in the periphery of the eurozone, with more than 40 per cent of the foreign claims on Greece, Ireland, Portugal, Italy and Spain being French and German. In 2010 the Bank for International Settlements recorded between US$186.4 billion and $208.3 billion in total exposure to Ireland, with $57.8 billion in exposure to Irish banks. The German monetary financial institution sector was the largest investor in Irish bank bonds during the pre-crisis period and according to the Bundesbank's consolidated figures German banks had, by September 2008, the month of the bank guarantee, €135 billion invested in Ireland. These figures for the exposure of German banks to "Irish" banks, however, relate almost in their entirety to their exposure to their own large subsidiaries based in Dublin's International Financial Services Centre, for example Depfa, which reportedly had an external focus and external ownership.

The rising rate of foreign borrowing by local Irish banks in the years before 2008 reflected the enormous increase in their lending into the Irish property market, a lending area which since 1996 seemed to be able to provide an endless flow of profitable lending opportunities as the Irish public relentlessly bought and sold property.

The total stock of mortgage loans in Ireland exploded from €16 billion in the first quarter of 2003 to a peak of €106 billion by the third quarter of 2008, about 60 percent of Ireland's GDP for that year. This, in turn, led to a massive increase in the price of Irish property assets. The freezing-up of the world's interbank market during the 2008 financial crisis caused two problems for Irish banks.

Firstly, with no new money available to borrow, withdrawal of deposits caused a liquidity problem. In other words, there was no cash available to honour withdrawal requests. A liquidity problem on its own is usually manageable through Central Bank funding.

However, the second problem was solvency and this was much more serious. The lack of new money meant no new loans which meant no new property deals. No new property purchases both exposed the fragile cash-flows of developers and highlighted the stratospheric valuations of property. With the value of most of their assets (loans) declining in line with the property market, the liabilities (deposits) of the six Irish domestic banks were now considerably greater than their assets. Insolvency loomed and Irish banks would need major cash injections (recapitalisation) to stay open.

== State responses ==
On 29 September 2008, Minister for Finance Brian Lenihan agreed to issue a broad state guarantee of Irish domestic banks under the Credit Institutions (Financial Support) Act 2008 for two years, with the intention of recapitalising them to enable them to continue to lend into the Irish economy.

Government interventions would cover liabilities existing from 30 September 2008 or at any time thereafter up to and including 29 September 2010. This guarantee was in respect of all retail and corporate deposits (to the extent not covered by existing deposit protection schemes in the State or any other jurisdiction), interbank deposits, senior unsecured debt, asset covered securities, and dated subordinated debt. On 20 October 2008, the Governing Council of the European Central Bank released their recommendations on government guarantees for bank debt which included the aim of "addressing the funding problems of liquidity-constrained solvent banks".

Recapitalisation was carried out at Ireland's two largest banks, Allied Irish Bank (AIB) and Bank of Ireland (BoI), with" bailouts" (enforced loans) of €3.5 billion confirmed for each bank on 11 February 2009. On 15 February 2009 Fine Gael leader Enda Kenny, speaking in County Cork, asked the entire board of the Central Bank of Ireland's Financial Regulation section to resign.

In late 2009, the Credit Institutions (Eligible Liabilities Guarantee) Scheme 2009 came into effect Amidst the crisis, the ruling Fianna Fáil party fell to fourth place in an opinion poll conducted by The Irish Times, placing behind Fine Gael, Labour and Sinn Féin, putting Labour and Sinn Féin ahead of Fianna Fáil for the first time in Irish history. On the evening of 21 November 2010, then Taoiseach Brian Cowen confirmed that Ireland had formally requested financial support from the European Union's European Financial Stability Facility and the International Monetary Fund (IMF), a request which was welcomed by the European Central Bank and EU finance ministers.

In November 2011, the Credit Institutions (Eligible Liabilities Guarantee) Scheme was extended by the Fine Gael – Labour coalition government to 31 December 2012, subject to European Union approval of state aid. This scheme guarantees specific issuances of short- and long-term eligible bank liabilities, including on-demand and term deposits, senior unsecured certificates of deposit, senior unsecured commercial paper, senior unsecured bonds and notes and certain other senior unsecured debt whose maturity could range from overnight to five years.

In March 2011, Central Bank Governor, Patrick Honohan described the crisis as "one of the most expensive banking crises in world history". In September 2011 he said that the banks were now financially sound.

== Anglo Irish Bank's irregularities ==
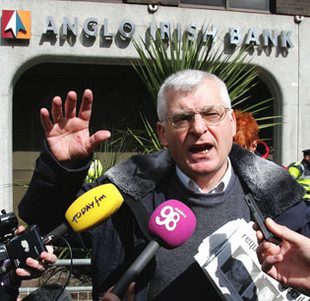
Joe Higgins, MEP speaking outside Anglo Irish Bank during a protest against the bank bailout in 2010

The December 2008 hidden loans controversy within Anglo Irish Bank led to the resignations of three executives, including chief executive Seán FitzPatrick. A mysterious "Golden Circle" of ten businessmen are being investigated over shares they purchased in Anglo Irish Bank in 2008.

Anglo Irish was nationalised on 20 January 2009, when the Irish government determined that recapitalisation would not be enough to save the bank. Since then it has emerged that Anglo Irish falsified its accounts before it was nationalised, with circular transactions between it and another bank, Permanent TSB, being uncovered. Denis Casey, the chief executive of Irish Life and Permanent, the company that owns Permanent TSB, resigned in the aftermath of this revelation.

=== Nationalisation ===
Emergency legislation to nationalise Anglo Irish Bank was voted through Dáil Éireann and passed through Seanad Éireann without a vote on 20 January 2009. President Mary McAleese then signed the bill at Áras an Uachtaráin the following day, confirming the bank's nationalisation.

=== Irish Life and Permanent interference ===
Following a revelation that Government appointed directors in Anglo Irish Bank and the Financial Regulator were investigating a deposit of billions of euros into the institution, Irish Life and Permanent admitted on 10 February 2009 that it had provided what it called "exceptional support" to Anglo during September 2008. Irish Life and Permanent confirmed it had made the deposit following the introduction of the Government Guarantee Scheme, which was set up to provide each bank under its jurisdiction with a limited supply of credit in the event of a collapse. However this volatility in deposits in Anglo Irish Bank has been stated as one of the reasons why the Government moved to nationalise it. The Financial Regulator has stated that the transactions which took place between the two banks are "unacceptable" and the chief executive of Irish Life and Permanent, Denis Casey, has resigned his position. However, in a press release dated 13 February 2009, the Financial Regulator revealed that "it encouraged Irish banks to work together where necessary so as to continue to use normal inter-bank funding arrangements for liquidity purposes."

=== Irish Nationwide involvement ===
On the evening of 17 February 2009 the chairman of the building society Irish Nationwide, Dr Michael Walsh, resigned his position.

== Resignation of the Financial Regulator ==
Following reports of a communication breakdown at the office of the Financial Services Regulatory Authority, the Chief Executive of the Financial Regulator Patrick Neary on 9 January 2009 announced his decision to retire as of 31 January that year. Neary's perceived weakness in dealing with Anglo Irish Bank received heavy criticism, with Green Party Senator Dan Boyle calling for a strengthening of powers within the organisation and saying that confidence in Irish financial services had been eroded by events of the previous six months. Financial observers indicated that a replacement for Neary might have to be sought in the United States or United Kingdom. Following the announcement, reports emerged which indicated that the Financial Regulator may have known of the Anglo loans for eight years prior to their revelation.

== Warning signs ignored and suppressed ==
The crisis began through a failure by banks, the government, news organisations and the corporate sector to heed signs that the economy was overheating. In June 2005, The Economist mentioned Ireland on a list of countries with recent property price inflation; Ireland's price inflation of 192% in 1997–2005 was the highest on its list. In December 2005, Professor Brian Lucey felt that prices would continue at a "modest but still significant pace".

Morgan Kelly, a professor of economics at University College Dublin, was particularly concerned about the real estate bubble which was reaching its climax in the summer of 2006. In an article published by the Irish Times, Kelly noted that the raise in house prices relative to income and rents is a strong indicator of their subsequent decrease, and that Ireland's house prices had risen 30% more than income since the year 2000. He then asserted that Irish real estate prices could possibly fall 40 – 50% when the bubble burst. His second article was rejected by the Irish Independent and lingered unpublished at The Sunday Business Post until the Irish Times agreed to run it in September 2007. Kelly predicted the collapse of Irish banks, which had fuelled the rapid rise of real estate by increasingly lowering their lending standards and relying more on 3-month interbank loans than on their deposit base.

Kelly's prognostications caused a minor controversy but mostly went unnoticed until March 2008, when Philip Ingram, an analyst at Merrill Lynch, wrote a scathing report about the real estate bubble, focusing on the three major Irish banks most responsible for the crisis, Anglo Irish, Bank of Ireland, and AIB. Merrill Lynch had major, lucrative underwriting relationships with those banks, and a senior executive at Anglo Irish, Matt Moran, who had registered displeasure with Kelly over his articles, among others, did the same to Merrill. Merrill in turn retracted the report within hours, and fired Ingram by yearend.

From May 2007 the banks' share prices on the Irish stock market declined markedly, and they had halved by May 2008. This had an inevitable effect on their capital adequacy ratios and therefore their ability to lend ever-higher amounts that were necessary to support property prices. In April 2008 Professor Cormac Ó Gráda noted that: "property prices [are] suffering a meltdown likely to last for some years", yet the bulk of new bank lending since 2000 was based on mortgages secured on property.

On 7 May 2008, Brian Lenihan Jnr was appointed Minister for Finance. Formerly a lawyer and minister, he had no experience of finance, and opponents deplored that he would have to "learn on the job". On 14 May 2008 he remarked that: ".. the risks that we identified in the last Budget have materialised, risks such as recent developments in the international financial markets, further appreciation of the euro against the dollar and sterling, lower international growth and domestically a sharper slowdown in housing". Ignoring the property bubble, he concluded that: ".. we are well placed to absorb the housing adjustments and external 'shocks' so that our medium-term prospects will continue to be favourable. Our public finances are sound, with one of the lowest levels of debt in the euro area. Our markets are flexible allowing us to respond efficiently to adverse developments. We have a dynamic and well-educated labour force. We have a pro-business outward looking society. The tax burden on both labour and capital is low. Not many countries anywhere in the world are facing the present global economic difficulties with such advantages."

== Recapitalisations of AIB and Bank of Ireland ==
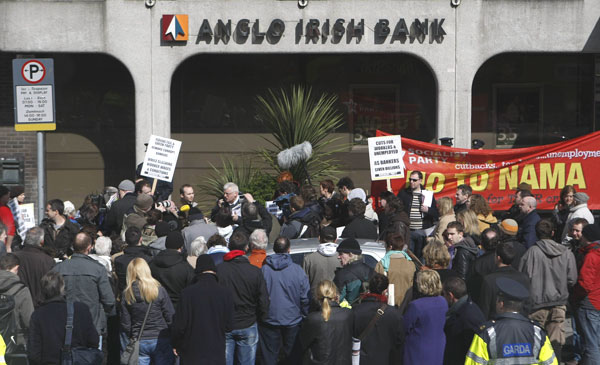
Protestors outside Anglo Irish Bank during protests against the bank bailout in April 2010

Having guaranteed the six main Irish banks in September 2008, the Minister for Finance, Brian Lenihan announced on 21 December 2008 that he would seek to recapitalise Ireland's three main banks, Allied Irish Bank (AIB), Bank of Ireland (BoI) and Anglo Irish Bank. Under the plan the Government would take €2 billion in preference shares in each of Bank of Ireland and Allied Irish Bank and €1.5 billion in preference shares in Anglo Irish Bank, giving it a 75% control of the latter.

On 11 February 2009, Lenihan announced the provision of two €3.5 billion bailouts to AIB and BoI as part of his government's recapitalisation scheme. The plan would also see the Minister appoint 25% of the directors at each bank, whilst the banks had agreed to provide a 30% increase in mortgages for first-time buyers and a 10% increase in loans to small and medium businesses as well as to hold-off on repossessions of mortgage holders for twelve months after they fall into arrears. The salaries of senior bank executives will be frozen and they will not receive performance bonuses. However, it was found in 2013 that pay rates at Irish banks increased between 2008 and 2012. Richard Bruton of the then opposition party Fine Gael, responded by calling the recapitalisation plan a "€7 billion gamble on the wrong horse".

Bank of Ireland chief executive Brian Goggin announced his retirement in January 2009, confessing to RTÉ that his bank has made bad lending decisions. Asked about his expected salary for 2009, Goggin admitted that it would be "less than €2 million". Goggin had earned approximately €3 million in the year to 31 March 2008. He was replaced as CEO by Richie Boucher whose appointment was announced on 25 February.

== Economic Adjustment Programme for Ireland ==
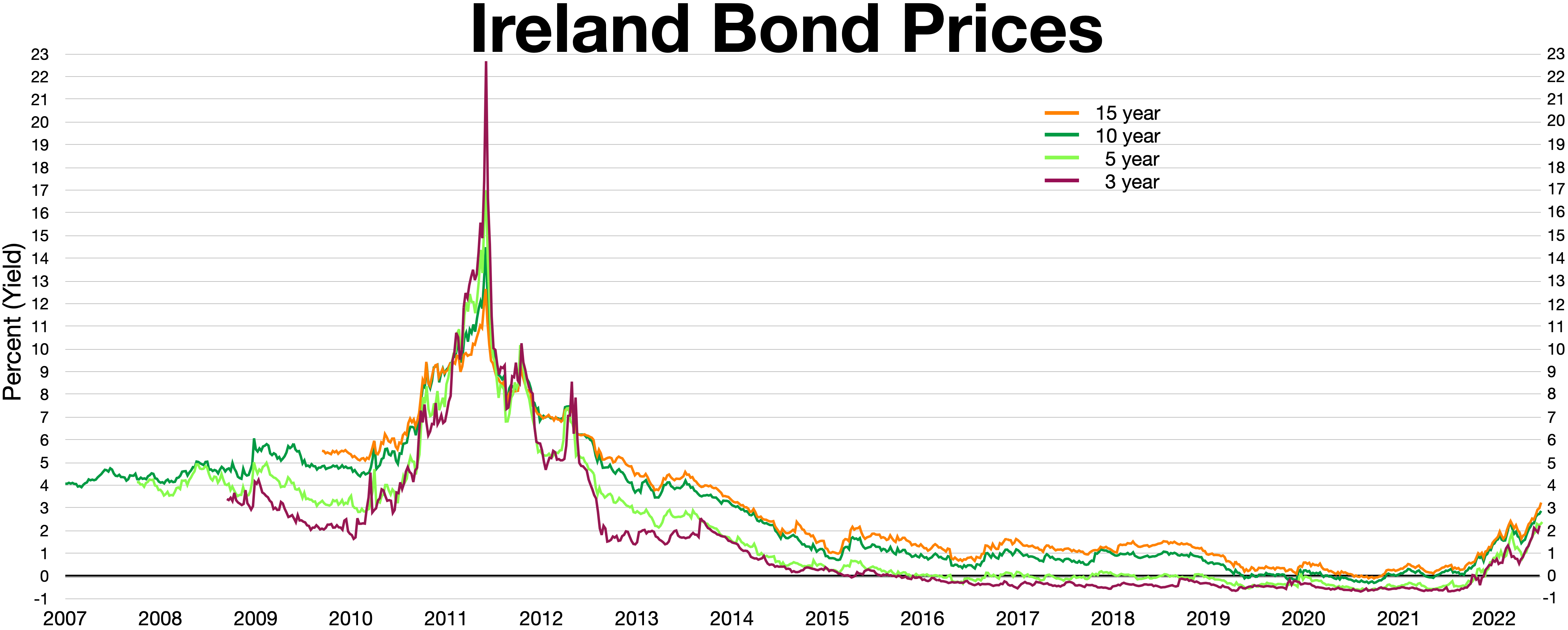
Ireland bond prices, Inverted yield curve in 2011 15 year bond 10 year bond 5 year bond 3 year bond

At the end of September 2010 the 2008 guarantee covering the six bailed out banks expired. Prior to the lapsing of the Credit Institutions (Financial Support) Act 2008 the Credit Institutions (Eligible Liabilities Guarantee) Scheme 2009 (the "ELG Scheme") came into effect on 9 December 2009. The ELG Scheme provides for an unconditional and irrevocable State guarantee for certain eligible liabilities (including deposits over the €100,000 limit of the Deposit Guarantee Scheme) of up to five years in maturity incurred by participating institutions from the date they joined the scheme until the closure of the Scheme on certain terms and conditions. The NTMA was appointed by the Minister for Finance as the ELG Scheme Operator.

Just before the expiry of the guarantee, the covered banks faced a huge set of bond repayments – a result of most lenders only lending to the covered banks within the period of the original blanket guarantee – which resulted in a rapid and massive resort to ECB financing. Government ownership, and thus responsibility, for the Irish domestic bank sector reached a high under the guarantee, with Anglo Irish nationalised early in 2009, and Allied Irish Banks(AIB) nationalised at the end of the guarantee. These proved in the long run to be the two most expensive banks to recapitalise, with Anglo accounting for €34.7 billion and AIB €20.7 billion of the bank bailout total of €62.8 billion (55% and 33% respectively). Much (€46.3 billion, or 74%) of the bank bailout was in fact completed by October 2010, but at the time the extent of any further recapitalisations were not known, and the nationalisations committed the government either to go on to cover whatever was needed or face the failure of the banks despite the amount already committed.

By October 2010 Irish sovereign bond yields were above 7%, making further market borrowing unrealistic at a time when the government deficit was running at €16.7 billion. Although the government initially denied that there were any problems, and cited themselves as "fully funded well into 2011", in November 2010 the government had to seek a €67.5 billion "bailout" from the EU, other European countries (via the European Financial Stability Facility fund and bilateral loans) and the IMF as part of an €85 billion 'programme'. On 28 November 2010, European Commission, European Central Bank (ECB) and the International Monetary Fund (IMF), colloquially called the European Troika, agreed with the Irish government in a three-year financial aid programme on the condition of far-reaching austerity measures to be imposed on the Irish society in order to cut government expenditure. The agreements were signed on 16 December 2010 by the Irish government and the European Commission.

The Irish State assigned €17.5 billion to this 'bailout', an amount that was equal to the Total Discretionary Portfolio of the National Pensions Reserve Fund. The initial interest rates stipulated for the bailout loans were onerous, coming in at around 6% over all the lenders – although these were rapidly adjusted to well below market rates (averaging somewhere around 3% across all lenders). The severity of these initially proposed rates left a lingering shock.

While it is generally assumed that EU/IMF bailout was mainly for the banks, this was not ever the intention, and not reflected in the facts. The original bailout agreement marked a portion of the loaned money for any bank recapitalisations – again, this reflects the uncertainty over whether the PCAR stress tests in early 2011 would reveal further large funding needs. However, the Irish government used none of the borrowed money for bank recapitalisation, at least directly. The close match between the amount of the EU/IMF loans (€67.5 billion) and the bank bailouts (€62.8 billion, but often cited as €64.5 billion) may foster this assumption. In fact, the bank bailout was funded through a combination of NPRF cash and promissory notes – the former required no borrowing, being cash to hand, while the latter was a promise to pay at a later date, which required no immediate borrowing.

While the promissory notes were recorded on the national debt – because they would eventually require payment, and were thus a liability – they did not involve any expenditure at the time. The further re-capitalisations undertaken following the Prudential Capital Assessment Review stress tests in early 2011, amounting to €16.5 billion or 27% of the total bank costs, were met from a combination of Exchequer cash and National Pensions Reserve Fund cash, with the cost of the re-capitalisations defrayed by some €16 billion in haircuts on junior bondholders.

While the government deficit was financed by the EU/IMF loans during the period of high market rates, the Irish banks also continued to be largely locked out of debt markets, and their liquidity was provided by the ECB and Central bank of Ireland. By August 2011 total liquidity funding for the six banks by the ECB and the Irish Central Bank came to about €150 billion; the largest and healthiest of the six, Bank of Ireland, then had a market capitalisation of just €2.86 billion. In April 2012 the 99.8% state owned bank, Allied Irish Banks, had paid one and a half billion Euro to unsecured bank bondholders for which neither the bank nor the Irish state had no legal liability.

On 26 February 2013 the Minister for Finance announced the closure of the ELG Scheme to all new liabilities from midnight on 28 March 2013. After this date, no new liabilities will be guaranteed under the ELG Scheme. This does not affect any liabilities already guaranteed as of 28 March 2013. On 15 December 2013, Ireland successfully exited the bailout programme, with market bond rates at a recent historic low. In August 2014 Ireland was considering early repayment of some of the outstanding €22.5 billion in IMF programme loans which would save it several hundred million euro in surcharges.

In December 2014, Ireland's debt management body, the NTMA, repaid €9 billion in IMF loans, by borrowing that €9 billion at cheaper rates.

== Committee of Inquiry into the Banking Crisis ==
The Committee of Inquiry into the Banking Crisis met for the first time on 19 June 2014 (in private). Public hearings began in 2015.

It was a joint committee of the Houses of the Oireachtas. It was formally established in November 2014 under the Houses of the Oireachtas (Inquiries, Privileges and Procedures) Act 2013. It published its final report on 27 January 2016.

== Denis O'Brien controversy ==
=== Background ===
In 2015, billionaire Denis O'Brien successfully applied for an injunction against RTÉ preventing the state broadcaster from airing a report on how O'Brien was receiving, with the direct permission of former CEO of the Irish Bank Resolution Corporation (IBRC)—the former Anglo Irish Bank, a rate of approximately 1.25% when IBRC should have been charging 7.5%. This in turn led to outstanding sums of upwards of €500 million. O'Brien then wrote to special liquidator Kieran Wallace to demand that these same favourable terms that were granted him by way of verbal agreement be continued. The Irish government later appointed Kieran Wallace to conduct an investigation into these same dealings. Wallace then cooperated with IBRC and Denis O'Brien to seek an injunction in Ireland's High Court to hide this information from the public. High Court judge Donald Binchy granted O'Brien the injunction and told the court that certain elements of the judgment would have to be redacted. The Irish media therefore could not report on details of the injunction.

=== Catherine Murphy's involvement ===
Catherine Murphy, TD, attempted to raise the issue in the Dáil on 27 May 2015. Seán Barrett ruled her contributions "out of order". Murphy attempted to raise the matter again the following day, this time with more success. Lawyers acting for O'Brien immediately forced the country's media to censor its own coverage, with some media outlets confirming they had received warnings from O'Brien's lawyers. RTÉ reporter Philip Boucher-Hayes tweeted that Drivetime would play Murphy's speech; in the event, Murphy's speech was not broadcast and his tweet was later deleted. Tonight with Vincent Browne (with Browne absent and instead moderated by Ger Colleran, editor of INM's Irish Daily Star) featured Colleran reading a statement from TV3 management asserting that no discussion about Murphy's comments would be allowed following letters from O'Brien's lawyers. Foreign commentators covering these events for the international media suggested Irish democracy had been "wiped away at a stroke".

== IBRC Commission of Investigation ==
In June 2015, the government announced the launch of a Commission of Investigation into IBRC's business dealings, to be headed by a High Court judge. This was to take place instead of a previously announced inquiry which was to be conducted by KPMG, IBRC's own auditors. The commission is due to report before the end of 2015. The commission will investigate transactions, activities and management decisions which resulted in a loss of €10 million or more for the taxpayer. It will also cover "internal IBRC governance procedures and controls" and whether these "were fit for purpose", and will also examine the controversial sale of Siteserv to Denis O'Brien following a debt writedown of €119 million.

== See also ==
- Irish Bank Resolution Corporation
- List of banking crises
- National Asset Management Agency
- Post-2008 Irish economic downturn
- Put on the green jersey
