= Michael Fingleton =

Irish banker (1938–2026)

- Born: 26 January 1938; Tubbercurry, County Sligo, Ireland
- Died: 2 August 2026 (aged 88)
- Occupation: CEO of Irish Nationwide Building Society
- Spouse: Eileen
- Children: Michael Fingleton Jr.

Michael Fingleton (26 January 1938 – 2 August 2026) was an Irish banker who was the chief executive of Irish Nationwide Building Society. He joined the building society in 1971 and retired in April 2009 as the effects of the 2008–2012 Irish banking crisis became apparent. He is known as "Fingers" in the banking community.

== Early life and career ==
Michael Fingleton was born in Tubbercurry, County Sligo on 26 January 1938, the son of a local Garda. He attended St Nathy's school in Ballaghaderreen, and in later years UCD, TCD and Kings Inns. He attended a seminary, but quit before taking his vows.

In the early 1960s, he joined Allied Irish Finance and simultaneously began studying commerce. On earning his degree, he went to the Dairy Disposal Agency, a state body that took over defunct creameries in the west of Ireland. During this period, he studied at night to become a chartered accountant.

Following this, he joined aid agency Concern and from 1969 he spent a number of years organising food supplies to the Republic of Biafra, the short-lived secessionist state in southeastern Nigeria. He eventually became chairman of Concern.

== Career at Irish Nationwide ==
In 1971, he became the secretary of the Irish Independent Building Society, founded in 1873. At the time he was not a homeowner. The building society had five employees and assets of €2 million. In his first year at the helm, the company made a profit of just €12,000 and Fingleton had to wait three years for his first company car.

In 1973 he was called to the bar, the same year that Dick Spring, Michael McDowell and Adrian Hardiman were also called, although he never practised as a barrister.

The building society changed its name to Irish Nationwide in 1975 and began to expand. The key to its expansion was marketing, using the media to build the profile of the business. The emphasis was on the use of agents rather than opening branches. Fingleton built it up into a network of 50 branches and 40 branch agents, helped by the takeover of the Garda Building Society, Irish Mutual and Metropolitan Building Society and enacted a flexible mortgage policy in the 1980s. Fingleton cultivated relationships with the press and benefitted by receiving free publicity. Many journalists in the 1980s received mortgages from the Irish Nationwide. Fingleton always stressed that these were all above board. During the 1980s, when he was at the height of his media profile, he sent journalists a Christmas card portraying himself as Santa Claus.

Fingleton drew a salary of €1.3 million in 2005, including a €500,000 bonus making his earnings on a par with chief executives of the larger banks. He began to look for demutualisation legislation in 2001 with the change in the law coming through in August 2006. In 2007, after failed talks with Germany's HypoVereinsbank and GE Money, he almost sold the building society to Iceland's Landsbanki. Fingleton set Irish Nationwide's asset value close to €1.3 billion to reflect the equity he expected to be released from any deals. Fingleton expected to earn up to €15 million from the deal. Landsbanki who were initially attracted by Irish Nationwide's deposit book, backed off, unnerved by the level of the society's commercial lending. The Icelandic bank collapsed nine months later.

He had a reputation as an autocrat and effectively ran a one-man lending department with loans of over €500,000 being personally approved by him. In 2002 it emerged that he had an affair with a subordinate who was provided with a £200,000 settlement after she took her case to the Employment Appeals Tribunal. When Irish Nationwides home loans manager Brian Fitzgibbon sued to stop the building society from sacking him in 2007, it reinforced the impression that Fingleton totally dominated the institution. In his evidence, Fitzgibbon alleged that Fingleton over-ruled his decision not to lend money to rogue solicitors Micheal Lynn and Thomas Byrne to whom the building society loaned over €10 million each. Fitzgibbon went on to allege that the Nationwide's lending decisions "were entirely informal and controlled by Michael Fingleton". Fitzgibbon also stated that many loans issued by the Irish Nationwide had not been approved by its credit committee, which existed only to satisfy the requirements of the Central Bank of Ireland. Fingleton said the society took "adequate provisions" in 2007 for loans to the rogue solicitors as it booked a total loan loss charge of €48.8 million.

By the end of 2007, Irish Nationwide had become a major financial institution with pre-tax profits of €390 million for 2006 and gross assets of €16.1 billion. He had managed to bring the group's cost-to-income ratio down to 10pc from 14.4pc the previous year. The same year, Fingleton transferred a €27.6 million pension fund from the society.

=== Loans to politicians and other public figures ===
As well as arranging loans for journalists, Fingleton arranged loans for other political and public figures. In December 2009, after interviewing Olivia Greene, a former home loans supervisor at Irish Nationwide, Prime Time reported that former Minister for Finance Charlie McCreevy was loaned €1.6 million for a €1.5 million property by Irish Nationwide, when the building society was not supposed to be providing 100 per cent loans. He also provided a loan for Celia Larkin, the ex-partner of former taoiseach Bertie Ahern, without requiring any proof of income. John Mara, the son of former Fianna Fáil director of elections PJ Mara, was also named in court as having drawn down big loans, including a €1.5 million loan for which Fingleton did not seek any additional security.

Greene also said Fianna Fáil Senator Francis O'Brien and Senator Don Lydon were given fast-track loans of €7 million and €3 million.

=== Effects of the economic crisis and retirement ===
The performance of the building society crashed in 2008 as bad loans spiralled. Irish Nationwide made a pretax loss of €280 million for the year, after writing off €464 million on bad loans, a 10-fold increase on the 2007 figure. The state was eventually forced to inject €2.7 billion into the society to shore up its balance sheet and prevent the collapse of a government-guaranteed institution.

In the run-up to the 2008 annual board meeting, with Fingleton approaching 70, when he would be required to retire as a director, the board considered tabling a motion that would permit him to stay on for another two years. The idea was abandoned and Fingleton refused to stay on as the chief executive unless he was paid the same amount as in 2007, when he had received a €1 million bonus. At the end of April 2009, Fingleton retired, buffeted by criticism for receiving the €1 million "bonus" in 2008. He left Irish Nationwide relying on the continued support of the Irish government through the guarantee scheme to raise funding from bond investors to keep the institution in business. Losses from 2009 of €2.5 billion effectively wiped out all profits made by the society since its inception as Irish Nationwide. Fingleton received €221,000 in pay for the final four months of his employment, up to April 2009. This amount, calculated on an annual basis, exceeded the cap of €500,000 imposed by the Government for top bankers.

As the depth of the society's problems became apparent, Fingleton came under public and political pressure to return the €1 million bonus. In April 2010, he offered to give it to charity, but this proposal was rejected by the Irish government. As of December 2010 there was no evidence that the money had been returned.

== Personal life and death ==
Fingleton was married to Eileen. They lived in Shankill in South Dublin, and had four children. Their son is a former employee of Irish Nationwide.

Fingleton died from complications of a stroke on 2 August 2026, at the age of 88.

== See also ==
- Seán FitzPatrick
- Irish property bubble
- Post-2008 Irish economic downturn
