= Collins v Minister for Finance =

Irish Supreme Court case

- Coat of arms of Ireland
- Court: Supreme Court of Ireland
- Decided: 16 December 2016
- Citation: [2016] IESC 73; [2017] 1 I.L.R.M. 65; [2017] 3 I.R. 99

Case history
- Appealed from: High Court
- Appealed to: Supreme Court

Court membership
- Judges sitting: Denham C.J., O’Donnell, McKechnie, Clarke, Dunne and Charleton JJ.

Case opinions
- The Appeal of Joan Collins, TD to the legality of the Minister for Finance giving promissory notes to financial institutions

Keywords
- Constitution of Ireland, State finance, Locus standi, Ministerial power

Collins v Minister for Finance [2016] IESC 73; [2017] 1 ILRM 65; [2017] 3 IR 99, is case in which the Irish Supreme Court held that the Minister for Finance did not breach his power in issuing promissory notes (promises to pay money at a later date) under the Credit Institutions (Financial Support) Act 2008, which was found to be constitutional. Collins's appeal was dismissed by the Supreme Court, which concluded that, "a Minister for Finance can spend any amount of money they deem necessary in an emergency without going back to the Dáil". The case thus legalised emergency measure to deal with Ireland's financial crisis. This was a case in which "the matters described" were of "national importance."

== Background (and High Court challenge) ==
In 2011, under section 6 of the Credit Institutions (Financial Support) Act 2008, the Minister for Finance issued promissory notes to the value of EUR 30 billion to two financial institutions. These were the Educational Building Society (EBS), and the Irish Bank Resolution Corporation (IBRC). Under the terms of this deal, this imposed a repayment liability of EUR 3 billion per year on the state. Joan Collins, TD (the appellant) took judicial review proceedings, asserting that this was subject to section 6 of the 2008 Act, which was above the power of the Minister for Finance, and it was unconstitutional for the Oireachtas (Irish parliament) to approve this expenditure for the Minister. Ms. Collins argued that this issue of promissory notes should have been subject to a Dáil Éireann vote. When this case was brought before the High Court, one of the issues that arose for Ms. Collins was her lack of locus standi, (legal standing) as she was only elected in 2011, after 2008, when the Credit Institutions (Financial Support) Act 2008 was passed and after 2010, when the promissory notes had been issued.

Within the Irish Constitution, there were several articles set out that Ms. Collins asserted where breached when she brought forward her appeal, which were Article 11, Article 17, and Article 28.

== Holding of the Supreme Court ==
The case was heard before a six judge panel, each of whom contributed to the written judgement. The court noted that "There is no doubt but that the constitutional provisions under consideration in this case are of the highest importance." It then went on to agree with the High Court's previous decision. However, the Court agreed that the sole entity who can create law under the Irish Constitution is the House of the Oireachtas. The court's summary of the delegation of power in financial matters is that the Constitution provides something of a "double lock on expenditure". According to Article 17.2 of the Constitution, "Dáil Éireann shall not pass any vote or resolution, and no law shall be enacted, for the appropriation of revenue or other public moneys unless ... recommended to Dáil Éireann by a message from the Government signed by the Taoiseach" However, under Article 11 of the Constitution, the Government cannot expend monies for purposes that are not authorised by the law. Thus, neither the Government, the Dail or the Oireachtas can validly authorise the expenditure of public monies without the approval of the other branch. This is a constitutional model.

The court found that the 2008 Act was "undoubtedly law", but did not provide for the issuance of promissory notes - this power was delegated to the Minister. The question for the court then was whether this delegation of power was impermissible and unconstitutional. The court found that the 2008 Act provided sufficient limitations on the Minister's ability to make financial decisions as constitutionally valid. This was contained in the following statement:

"The opinion formed by the Minister after consultation with the Governor and the Regulatory Authority, and necessarily endorsed by the Oireachtas, is threefold, and requires three related opinions in ascending order of seriousness: first, that there is a serious threat to the stability of credit institutions in the State generally, or that there would be such a threat if the functions under the Act were not performed; second, that the performance of those statutory functions is necessary for maintaining the stability of the financial system in the State; and third, that the performance of those functions is necessary to remedy a serious disturbance in the economy of the State. Significantly, under s. 2(2) it is envisaged that the Minister may continue to consult with Governor and Regulatory Authority in the continuing performance of the functions under this Act."

In the case of the promissory notes, the Court found that the Credit Institutions (Financial Support) Act 2008 was not an unconstitutional delegation of power to the Government under the 2008 Act. This was particularly the case regarding the extreme circumstances then facing the State; "[t]he amount actually involved here was vast, and the impact on the State's finances significant. The legislation is therefore in every sense exceptional." As the court noted, "it was a permissible constitutional response to an exceptional situation. It cannot therefore be considered to be a template for broader Ministerial power on other occasions".

The court dismissed the appeal.
