= Bankhaus Lampe =

German bank

Coordinates: 52°01′13″N 8°31′55″E

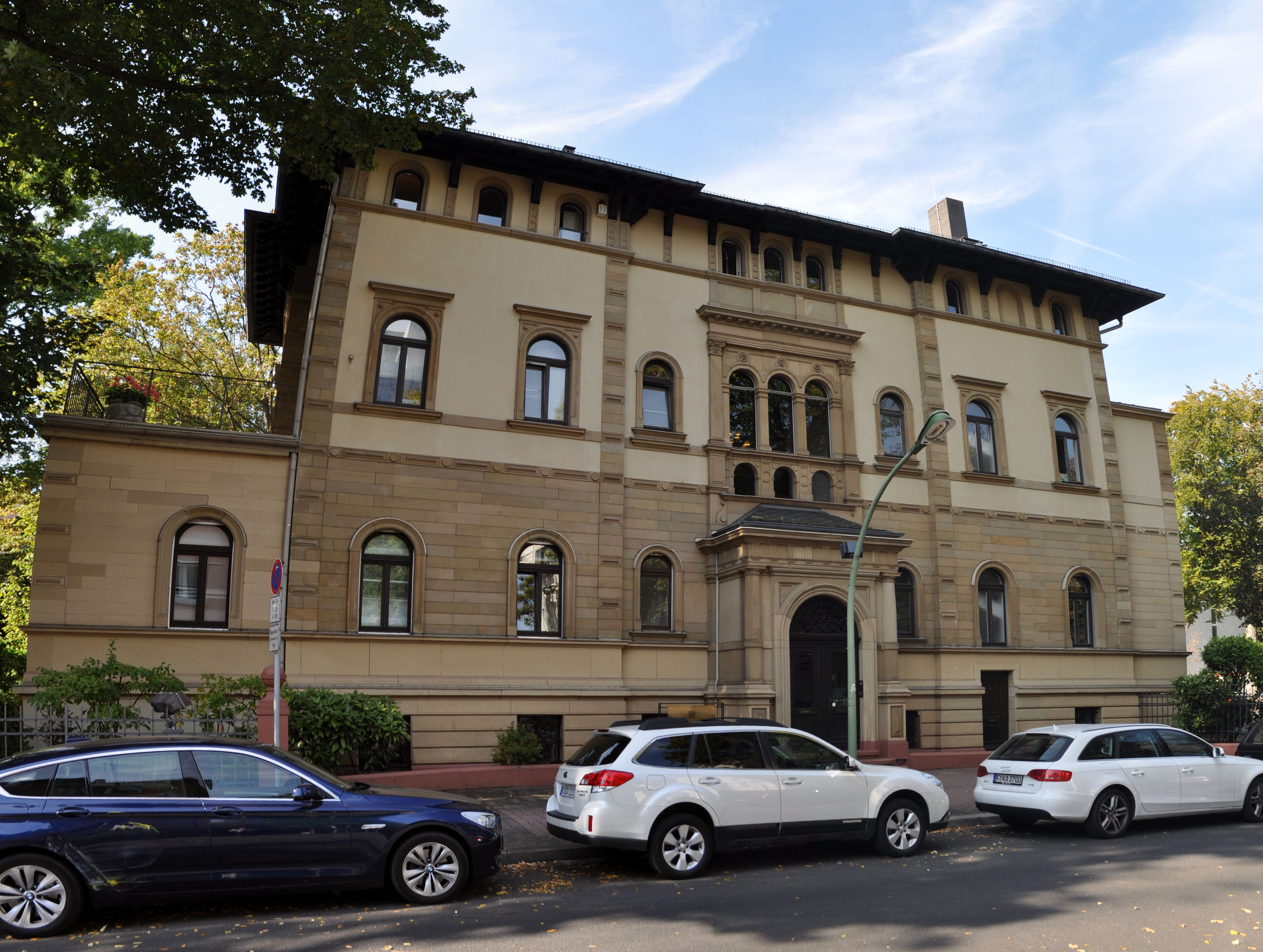
Bankhaus Lampe, Frankfurt

Bankhaus Lampe was an independent, private bank in Germany, founded in 1852 and headquartered in Bielefeld. The head office is in Düsseldorf, and additional offices are located in Germany, London, New York and Vienna. It is wholly owned by Hauck & Aufhäuser and focused on wealth management. The bank owned a 50% stake in Universal Investment that it sold to British private equity group Montagu in 2016.

The Bank also offers planning, asset advice and management, finance, private equity, investments, foreign currency, and online banking services.
