= Lime, Oregon =

Unincorporated community in the state of Oregon, United States

- Unincorporated community
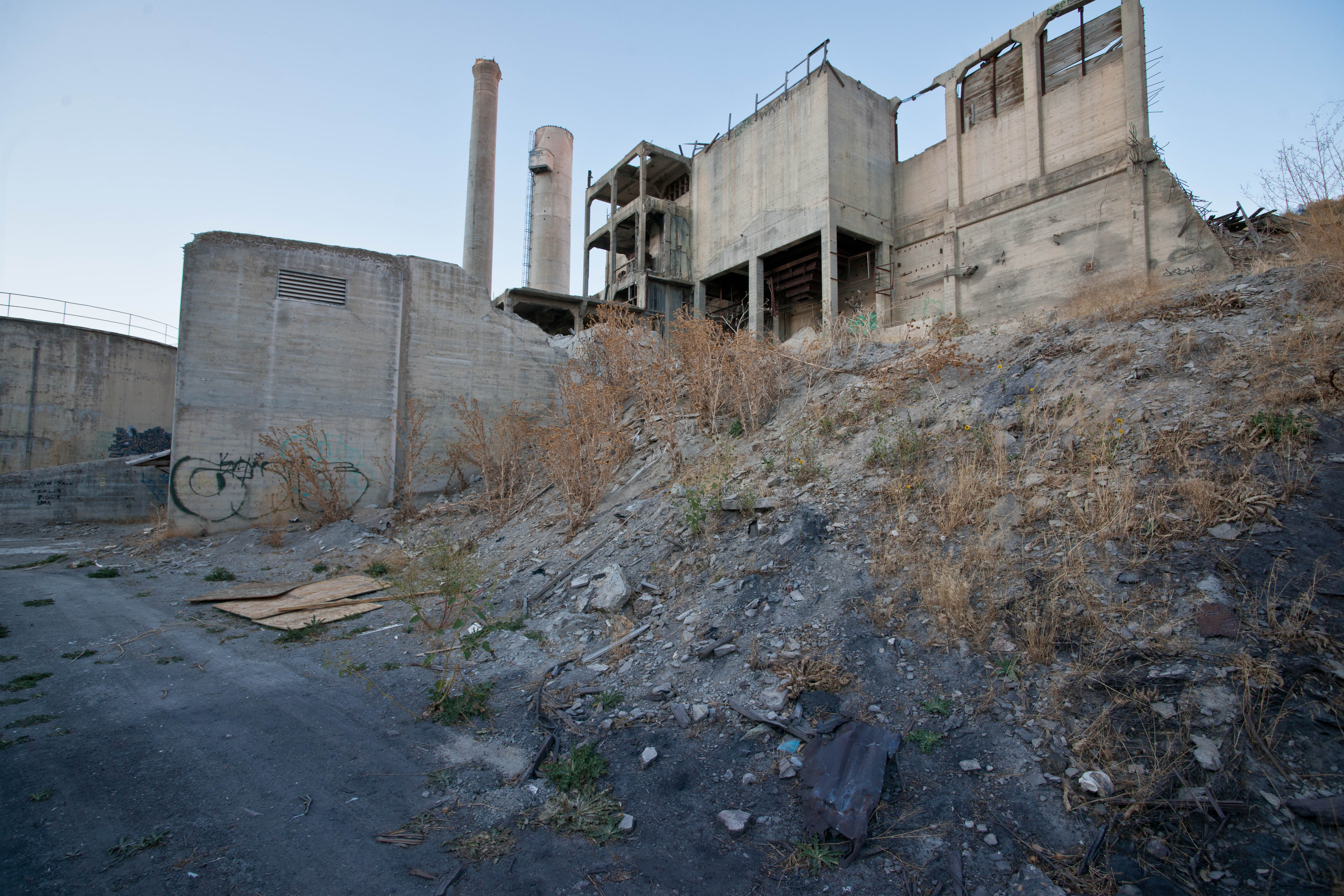
- Abandoned cement plant at Lime, circa 2012

- Location within the United States Location within Oregon
- Coordinates: 44°24′24″N 117°18′41″W
- Country: United States
- State: Oregon
- County: Baker
- Elevation: 2,234 ft (681 m)
- Time zone: UTC-8 (Pacific (PST))
  - Summer (DST): UTC-7 (PDT)
- Area codes: 458 and 541
- GNIS feature ID: 1167713

Lime is an unincorporated community and ghost town in the northwest United States, located in Baker County, Oregon. Five miles (8 km) north of Huntington on Interstate 84 (& U.S. Route 30), it is near the confluence of Marble Creek and the Burnt River on the Union Pacific Railroad. The historic Oregon Trail passes through Lime.

== History ==
The Lime post office was established 127 years ago in 1899. The deposits of limestone in the area were manufactured into lime that supplied a large area of Eastern Oregon and western Idaho. The Acme Cement Plaster Company built a plant at Lime in 1916 to produce plaster, then the Sun Portland Cement Company bought the plant in 1921 and built another facility for producing Portland cement. In 1926, the company merged with Oregon Portland Cement Company from Portland; by the 1960s, the Lime facility produced 1,200,000 barrels a year. In 1940, the community at its peak had a population of 18. The town began to decline when the post office closed in 1964.

As the nearby limestone deposits were depleted, limestone was brought from the Nelson area near Durkee. A new plant was built at Nelson in 1979 and the facility at Lime was closed in 1980. Oregon Portland Cement Company merged with the Ash Grove Cement Company in 1983.

In 1999, Baker County took possession of the site of the closed factory for back taxes. In 2018, the plant was scheduled for demolition; crews arrived that April to begin the work.

== See also ==
- Cement, California
- List of ghost towns in Oregon
