= Montagu Private Equity =

UK business

Montagu
- Trade name: Montagu Private Equity LLP
- Type: Private
- Industry: Private equity
- Founded: 1968
- Headquarters: London; Frankfurt; Paris; Luxembourg; New York
- Products: Leveraged buyout, Management buyout
- Total assets: €15 billion
- Number of employees: >150
- Website: www.montagu.com

Montagu is a mid-market private equity firm. The primary investment focus of Montagu is on management buyouts of performing businesses with enterprise values typically ranging from €200 million to €1 billion.

== History ==
The firm was founded in 1968 as a division of Midland Bank after Midland's acquisition of Montagu Trust, owner of Samuel Montagu & Co. The business was renamed HSBC Private Equity after HSBC acquired Midland Bank in 1992; the Montagu name was revived when Montagu's management team acquired 80.1% of Montagu shares from HSBC in 2003. In 2013, the team purchased the remaining 19.9% from HSBC.

In September 2016, Montagu acquired Berenberg Bank and Bankhaus Lampe's stakes in Universal Investment, thus gaining control of the German asset management firm.

In 2026, it was announced that Montagu would acquire a majority stake in BMC Helix through a carve-out transaction from BMC Software.
