= Buzzi Unicem =

Italian business

Buzzi S.p.A.

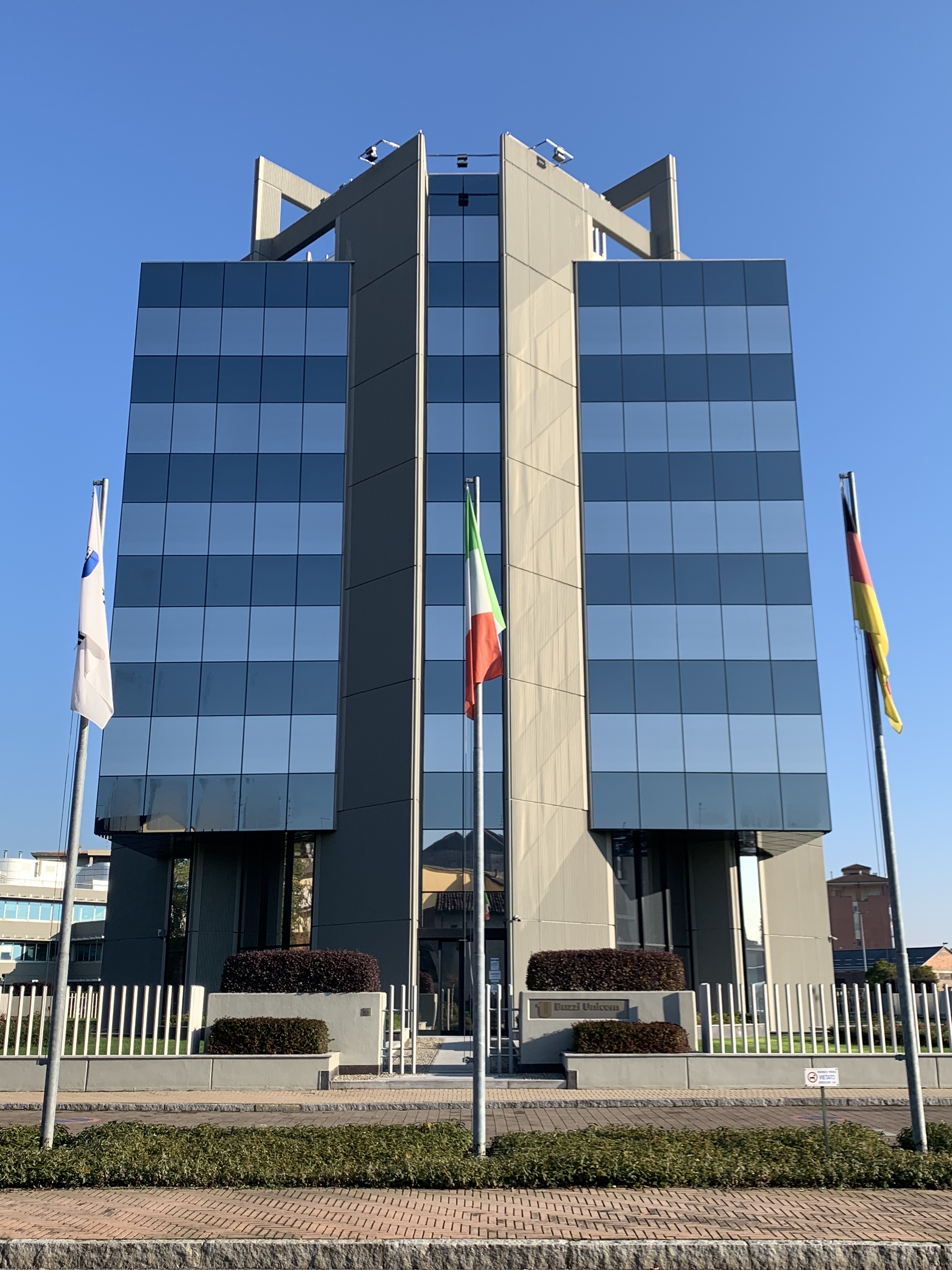
- Type: Società per Azioni
- Traded as: BIT: BZU; FTSE MIB Component
- Industry: Building materials
- Founded: 1907
- Headquarters: Casale Monferrato, Italy
- Key people: Veronica Buzzi (Chairman); Pietro Buzzi (CEO); Dirk Beese (General Manager)
- Services: Cement, construction aggregate, concrete
- Revenue: ▲€2,813 million (2012)
- Operating income: ▲€197 million (2012)
- Net income: ▼€2 million (2012)
- Total assets: ▼€5,802 million (2012)
- Total equity: ▼€2,603 million (2012)
- Number of employees: ▼10,837 (2012)
- Subsidiaries: Buzzi Unicem, Unical, Buzzi Unicem USA, Alamo Cement, Cimento Nacional, Dyckerhoff, Cimalux, Dyckerhoff Basal Nederland, Cement Hranice, ZAPA beton, Dyckerhoff Polska, SLK Cement, Corporación Moctezuma (50%), Alpacem Cement (25%), Société des Ciments de Hadjar Soud (35%), Société des Ciments de Sour el Ghozlane (35%), Laterlite (33%), Cementi Moccia (50%)
- Website: www.buzzi.com

Buzzi S.p.A. is an Italian company, quoted on the Borsa Italiana, which produces cement, ready-mix concrete, and construction aggregates. Its headquarters are in the town of Casale Monferrato which was once known as the Italian 'cement capital'. Today it has subsidiaries, interests and operations in Italy, Luxembourg, Germany, Algeria and Eastern Europe as well as in North America.

== History ==
The company was formed in September 1999 when Buzzi Cementi (founded as Fratelli Buzzi SpA in Trino by the brothers Pietro and Antonio Buzzi in 1907) took over Unicem (founded as Cementi Marchino in Casale by Luigi Marchino in 1878), and took on the name Buzzi Unicem. The company's founders were a large family connected to the successful Italian fencer, Lorenzo Buzzi; the Buzzi family has maintained a controlling shareholding in the business, reportedly amounting to approximately 59 percent of ordinary shares in 2024.

In 2004, the group acquired a controlling stake in the German cement company Dyckerhoff (founded as Portland-Cement-Fabrik Dyckerhoff & Söhne in Amöneburg by Wilhelm Gustav Dyckerhoff and his sons in 1864). Two years later, Buzzi Unicem launched an ultimately successful bid to fully acquire Dyckerhoff, although the firm's stake did increase to 88.37 percent.

In September 2014, the company purchased the Urals-based concrete activities of French industrial firm Lafarge in exchange for €104 million.

In May 2015, Buzzi Unicem's €120 million offer to purchase rival Italian cement producer Sacci, while accepted by the company itself, was dismissed by Sacci's creditors. Two years later, it wholly acquired the Italian firm Cementizillo via the purchase of the outstanding 52.1 percent of shares in exchange for €70.2 million.

In March 2018, Buzzi Unicem acquired the German firm Portlandzementwerke Seibel & Söhne through the Dyckerhoff subsidiary.

In September 2018, Buzzi Unicem revealed that it had acquired 50 percent of Brazil's BCPAR (owned by Grupo Ricardo Brannand), which includes two cement plants in the country, with an option to acquire the rest of the firm by 2025. This transaction reportedly involved a relatively low value, likely at a loss for the seller, that was compelled due to the precarious financial situation facing the Brazilian construction sector at that time. In November 2018, Buzzi Unicem was one of thirty companies that formed the advocacy group Global Cement and Concrete Association, as a partial replacement for the Cement Sustainability Initiative.

By 2018, the company had sales operations in across numerous counties, including the Czech Republic, Germany, Italy, Luxembourg, Netherlands, Poland, Russia, Slovakia, Ukraine, Mexico, Brazil and the United States.

In 2019, Buzzi Unicem acquired a cement plant in Tuscany and two grinding plants in Piedmont from the building materials company HeidelbergCement.

In March 2022, it was announced that Buzzi Union USA Inc. was transitioning to producing Portland limestone cement. That same year, Buzz enacted a new corporate structure aimed at clarifying the relationship between the parent company and its foreign subsidiaries. Also in 2022, Buzzi's plant in Maryneal, US, reportedly attained record production levels, outputting 1.03Mt of clinker and 1.18Mt of cement.

In May 2023, the company’s official name was shortened from Buzzi Unicem SpA to Buzzi SpA. That same year, the company denied public allegations that Buzzi had continued to be involved in the activities of the Russian firm SLK Cement following the outbreak of the Russo-Ukrainian war.

In October 2024, the company completed the acquisition of the remaining 50 percent of NCPAR from Grupo Ricardo Brennand, consolidating its presence in Brazil, where it has operated since 2018. That same year, Buzzi finalized the sale of its Ukrainian-based assets, including a pair of fully-integrated cement plants, to the American-Irish building materials firm CRH plc in exchange for €100 million. Also in 2024, Buzzi launched a trial of an energy-efficient carbon capture solution as part of a long term aim to produce low carbon cement.

In September 2025, Buzzi started using a new rail connection operated by Mercitalia Rail between the port of Savona and its Trino plant to transport slag; moving the bulk containers used required the use of a 35‑tonne forklift. That same year, the company acquired a 38 percent stage in the United Arab Emirates firm Gulf Cement Co PSC in exchange for $70 million.

In the mid 2020s, the company undertook the conversion of six of its US-based cement works away from coal and petcoke to being fuelled by cleaner natural gas instead.
