= Durkee, Oregon =

Unincorporated community in the state of Oregon, United States

- Unincorporated community
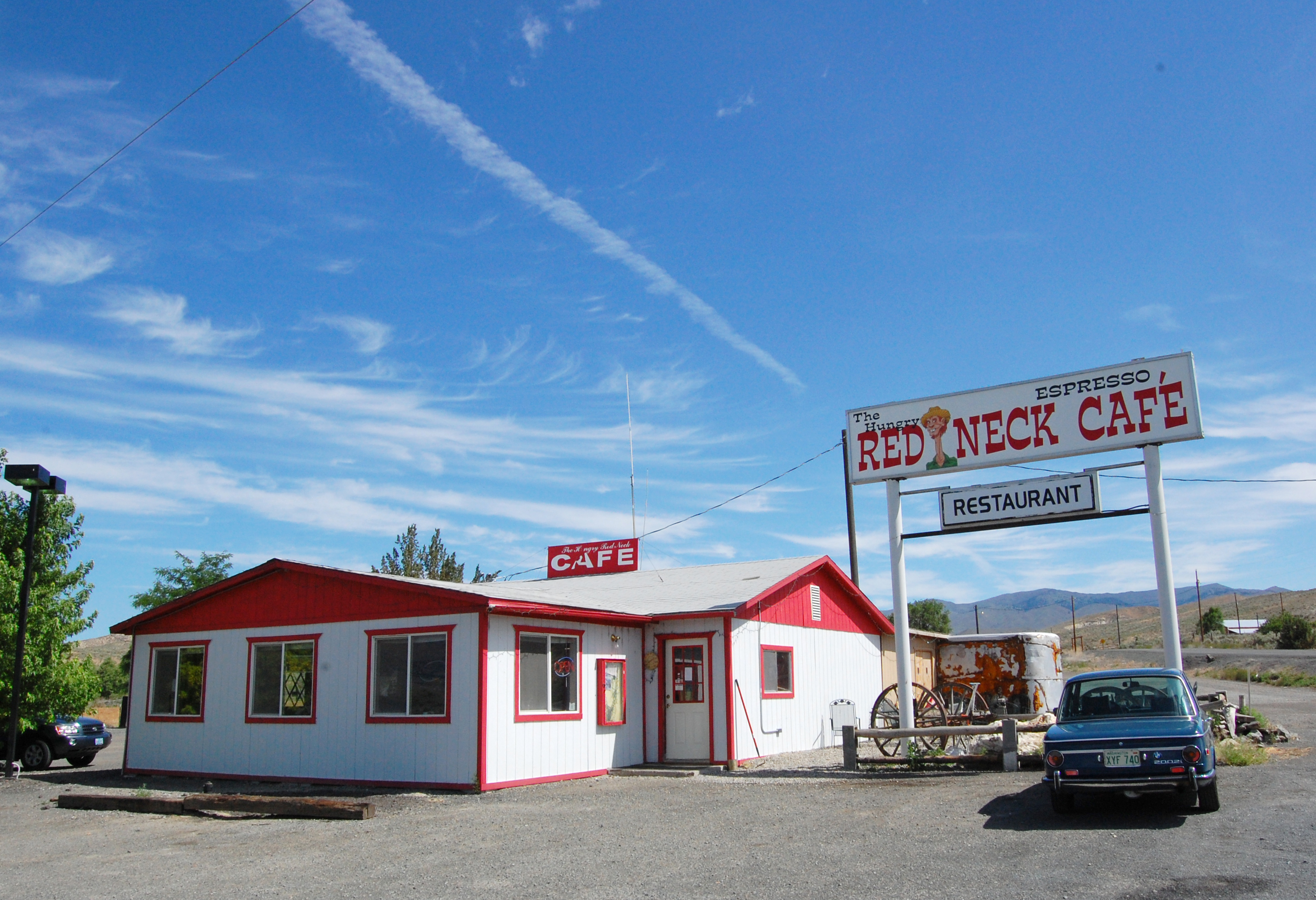
- Café in Durkee in 2008

- Location in the United States Location in Oregon
- Coordinates: 44°34′56″N 117°27′53″W
- Country: United States
- State: Oregon
- County: Baker
- Elevation: 2,651 ft (808 m)
- Time zone: UTC-8 (Pacific (PST))
  - Summer (DST): UTC-7 (PDT)
- Area codes: 458 and 541
- GNIS feature ID: 1136236

Durkee is an unincorporated community in Baker County, Oregon, United States. It has a post office with the ZIP code of 97905. Durkee lies at the Vandercar Road exit of Interstate 84. Durkee is known as the site of Oregon's only cement plant, the Ash Grove Cement Company plant in nearby Nelson. It is one of Baker County's largest private employers; opened in 1979, it succeeded the plant near Lime.

Durkee was originally a stage stop called Express, and by the 1860s it was the only transfer point between Umatilla, Oregon, and Boise, Idaho. It prospered as a water stop and telegraph station for the railroad, and later as a stop on Highway 30, the only paved road in the area. The community was platted in 1908, even though the population had already peaked.

== Education ==
In 1969 the local school had nine students.
