= Nelson, Oregon =

- Former unincorporated community
- Location in the United States Location in Oregon
- Coordinates: 44°32′23″N 117°25′08″W
- Country: United States
- State: Oregon
- County: Baker
- Elevation: 2,628 ft (801 m)
- Time zone: UTC-8 (Pacific (PST))
  - Summer (DST): UTC-7 (PDT)
- GNIS feature ID: 1136567

Nelson is an unincorporated historic locale in the northwest United States, located in Baker County, Oregon. It is about four miles (6 km) southeast of Durkee on U.S. Route 30 / Interstate 84.

Nelson is fifteen miles (24 km) northwest of Lime on the Burnt River and was the source of the limestone deposits used by the cement plant at Lime until the local deposits were depleted. A cement plant built in Nelson in 1979 replaced the one at Lime, which closed in 1980. The cement plant at Nelson closed temporarily in 2009, but as of 2014 it was operating again. The Ash Grove Cement Company refers to the plant as their Durkee plant.

Nelson is located on the Union Pacific Railroad mainline's Huntington Subdivision. The subdivision was originally owned by the Oregon Railway & Navigation Company; the original tracks were built here from 1882 to 1884.
