= Hauck & Aufhäuser =

German private bank

Coordinates: 50.1104°N 8.6744°E

Hauck Aufhäuser Lampe AG

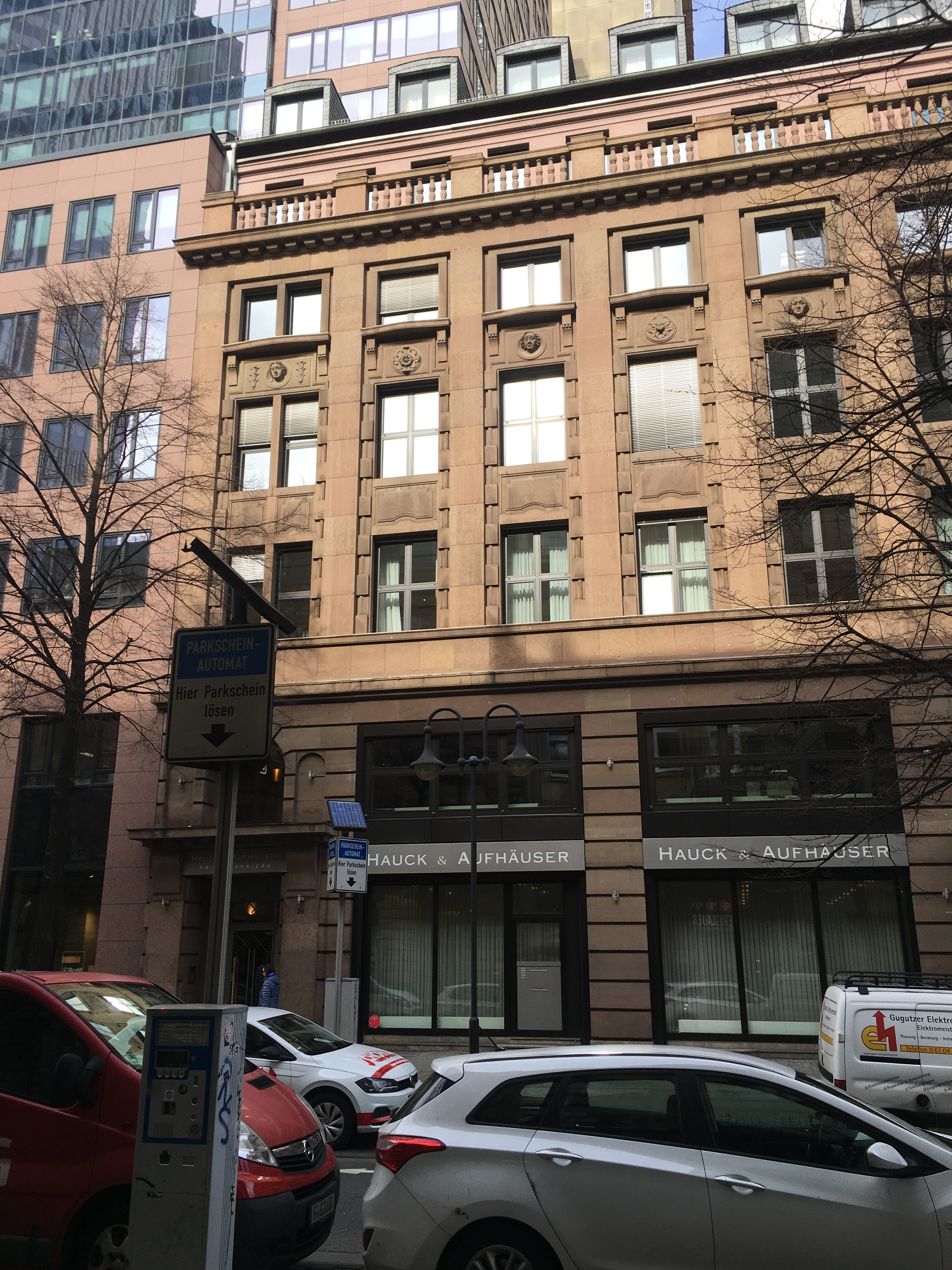
- Hauck & Aufhäuser headquarters in Frankfurt
- Type: Corporation
- Industry: Credit Institution
- Founded: 1753 (Platz & Gebhard); 1 January 1796 (current namesake)
- Headquarters: Frankfurt, Germany
- Number of employees: 722
- Parent: ABN AMRO
- Website: www.hauck-aufhaeuser.com

Hauck Aufhäuser Lampe AG (HAL, formerly Hauck & Aufhäuser Privatbankiers AG) was a bank based in Frankfurt am Main focused on the advisory and asset management of private and corporate clients as well as institutional investors and on cooperation with independent asset managers.

Created when Georg Hauck & Sohn Bankiers in Frankfurt merged with Bankhaus H. Aufhäuser in Munich in 1998, it maintained offices in Munich, Hamburg, Düsseldorf, Cologne, London, Luxembourg, Nanjing (China) and Shanghai (China)

Acquired by the Chinese conglomerate Fosun International in 2016, the bank was bought by the Dutch group ABN AMRO on July 1, 2025.

== History ==
=== Banking house Georg Hauck & Sohn ===
==== Development since the foundation in 1796 ====
On January 1, 1796 Friedrich Michael Hauck (1769–1839) became a new partner in the existing business Platz & Gebhard in Frankfurt am Main, in operation since 1753. Gebhard & Hauck, as the business was now called, ran the bill of exchange, commissions and freight forwarding business. Gebhard & Hauck operated banking transactions, like many trading houses of that time, at least in the beginning probably only incidentally. It is known that as early as 1800 Gebhard & Hauck granted the Upper Rhenish Circle a loan of 100,000 guilders at an interest rate of 4.5 percent. Friedrich Michael Hauck was a member of the Permanent Citizens' Representative from 1815 to 1825 and from 1817 to 1819 a member of the Legislative Body of the Free City of Frankfurt. From 1821 to 1829 he was Senior Manager of the Frankfurt Chamber of Commerce. During this time, he earned honors for his services to the Frankfurt Commercial policy, for example, for the establishment of the Central German Trade Association in 1828.

In 1839 Georg Heinrich (1812–1884) and Ferdinand Hauck (1813–1888) took over Gebhard & Hauck after the death of their father Friedrich Michael (whose partner Peter Gebhard had already died in 1814), but went separate ways in 1861. The Hauck brothers founded the banks Georg Hauck & Sohn and Ferdinand Hauck. The latter bank was quite successful for a while, but was liquidated in 1926 and transferred to Georg Hauck & Sohn. The Bank Georg Hauck & Sohn participated in the establishment and development of numerous companies in the Rhine-Main area, including the Frankfurter Bank in 1854 and the Metallgesellschaft.

In 1888, under the direction of Otto Hauck (* 10. April 1863 Frankfurt am Main, † 25. November 1934 Frankfurt am Main), the house, together with the Bankhaus J. J. Weiller Söhne, marketed the Farbwerke Hoechst at the stock market. A few years later, the bank house Hauck participated as a limited partner in Brown, Boveri & Cie.

The bank Georg Hauck & Sohn even survived difficult periods such as the German War in 1866, the German-French War of 1870-71, the founding crash in 1873, the November Revolution and the period of hyperinflation after the First World War as well as the Great Depression of the late twenties and early thirties almost unscathed.

==== National Socialism – Reprisals ====
On March 31, 1933 Otto Hauck resigned as a long-standing president of the Frankfurt Chamber of Commerce and Industry, together with the entire Bureau. In connection with the Nazi boycott of Jewish businesses of 1 April 1933, he had been attacked as a "half-Jew" because his mother Anna Hauck born Reiss (1839-1925) came from the long-established Jewish families Reiss and Flersheim. After Otto Hauck's death in 1934, his son Alexander Hauck (1893–1946) took over the management of the bank. According to the Nuremberg Laws, he was considered a "Jewish mixed race of the second degree", which led to a restriction of his civil rights. To secure the future of the bank, in 1938, the banking house Hauck acquired the majority of the 1804 founded banking business J. Ph. Keßler. Its previous owner Adolf Melber (1894–1972) joined the banking house Hauck as a managing director in 1939, and now represented the bank to the outside.

==== War and reconstruction, last Hauck retires ====
After the complete destruction of the bank's building in the Neue Mainzer Straße 30 in the air raids on Frankfurt am Main in March 1944, it was rebuilt after the war. In 1946 August Oswalt, Anne Marie Hauck and Michael Hauck became personally liable partners. In 1950, Georg Hauck & Sohn was transformed into a Kommanditgesellschaft (limited partnership), 1980 a Kommanditgesellschaft auf Aktien (limited partnership on shares). At the end of 1993, Michael Hauck (born 1927), the last member of the family, left the bank after 47 years as personally liable partner. Michael Hauck is now honorary chairman of the bank Hauck & Aufhäuser, and members of the family continue to belong to the circle of shareholders of the bank.

=== Banking house H. Aufhäuser ===
==== Founding 1870 ====
By Heinrich Aufhäuser (1842–1917) and Samuel Scharlach, the bank Aufhäuser & Scharlach was founded on 14 May 1870 in Munich. Already in the first years from 1870 to 1876, the balance sheet of the new bank increased fivefold. After Heinrich Aufhäuser had paid out his former partner Scharlach by 1892, the Institute was renamed Bankhaus H. Aufhäuser in 1894. The bank quickly gained a good reputation and soon counted et al. Duke Luitpold in Bavaria and the family of Thomas Mann as well as Neuberger and Alfred Einstein to its customers. At the turn of the century, the bank, which initially specialized in securities brokerage, became a high-volume bank. For the first time in 1913 H. Aufhäuser's balance sheet totaled over 10 million gold marks.

==== S. Bleichröder limited partner and successful 1920s ====
One of the most renowned German private banks since the Empire and the former house bank of the former Chancellor Otto von Bismarck, the Berlin bank Arnhold and S. Bleichroeder, became limited partner of the Bankhaus H. Aufhäuser in 1918 – also a hallmark of the concentration process at the banks since the turn of the century. The official name was now: H. Aufhäuser Kommandite von S. Bleichröder in Berlin. In 1921, Martin Aufhäuser's participation in S. Bleichröder resulted in a cross-shareholding between the two Jewish banks. At the same time, Ernst Kritzler, a shareholder of S. Bleichröder since 1917, joined the Bankhaus H. Aufhäuser. The 1920s were very successful years for H. Aufhäuser. Martin Aufhäuser (1875–1944) also sat on the board of the 1924 newly founded Golddiskontbank (Gold Discounter Bank), which was founded after the hyperinflation as a subsidiary of the Reichsbank in order to provide German foreign trade with convertible means of payment.

==== Aryanization ====
The successful years were interrupted by the "seizure of power" of the Nazis. Since the Aufhäusers belonged to the Jewish faith, the bank was subjected to massive reprisals and it lost a large part of its customers - by coercive measures (Jew boycott etc.), emigration or deportation.

The Bankhaus H. Aufhäuser was "forcefully Aryanized " as a result of the so-called Pogrom Night in early November and, in December 1938, Friedrich Wilhelm Seiler took over the bank. H. Aufhäuser was thus one of the last private banks and one of the most important ones that was aryanized in this way. The bank changed its name to Seiler & Co. and the Jewish employees had to be dismissed. Martin Aufhäuser had led the first negotiations with Frederick Seiler in the summer of 1938 more or less voluntarily; Seiler was the one to whom the Aufhäusers wanted to hand over their bank. Then after the Kristallnacht (Pogrom Night) the National Socialist authorities intervened massively in the negotiations and determine the path of aryanization. From the end of 1938 onwards, the business was mainly run by the Aufhäuser's close associate, Josef Bayer (1897–1965), who had been married to a Jewish woman since the 1920s, but could not be dismissed by the National Socialist authorities because of his knowledge of the bank. The Bankhaus Aufhäuser/Seiler succeeded in generating profits by 1944 without becoming involved in arms deals or the like. Josef Bayer, as well as the, since 1939, personally liable shareholder Otto Schniewind, who was temporarily scheduled to serve as minister of finance or economy in the planned government of Carl Friedrich Goerdeler, were taken to the concentration camp or rather taken into custody as a result of the assassination attempt of 20 July plot, but survived the Nazi era.

==== Reconstruction, Aufhäusers retire permanently ====
The brothers Martin and Siegfried Aufhäuser (1877–1949, since 1921 partner in the bank and British citizen) had to leave Germany destitute and humiliated and emigrated to London and via the Netherlands to the United States. In 1954, the Münchner Institut was renamed Bankhaus H. Aufhäuser again, and the descendants of the Aufhäusers were, already in 1953 retroactively to 1948, offered a 40-percent stake in the limited partnership. In 1955, due to the events during the Nazi era, the family Aufhäuser sold its shares completely and has since ceased to be involved in the bank; personal relationships continue to exist.

=== 1998–2022: Hauck & Aufhäuser ===
As of January 1, 1998, the Frankfurter Bankhaus Georg Hauck & Sohn and the Munich Banking Institute H. Aufhäuser zu Hauck & Aufhäuser KGaA. The partner circle of the bank consists of the speaker Michael Bentlage as well as Stephan Rupprecht and Wolfgang Strobel. Hauck & Aufhäuser sees itself as a traditional and modern private bank.

Until August 2016, Hauck & Aufhäuser was one of the few private bank houses that was run independently by personally liable partners and independent of the group. Besides the descendants of the founding family, the shareholders included Hans Langmann, former CEO of Merck Group, Frank Asbeck, CEO of SolarWorld AG as well as the family Findel-Mast, which owns Mast-Jägermeister SE.

On July 8, 2015, it was announced that Hauck & Aufhäuser is in sales talks with the Chinese investment group Fosun International. According to media reports the offer of Fosun amounted to €210 million. In August 2016, after more than a year of auditing, the takeover was confirmed by the European Central Bank (ECB) and the Banking and Financial Supervisory Authority (BaFin). For the first time, a German bank went to a majority shareholder from China. The management of Hauck & Aufhäuser remained unchanged as of January 2017.

In December 2016, the private bank announced that it would take over Sal. Oppenheim's fund platform business in Luxembourg and, as a result, the two resident companies Sal. Oppenheim jr. & Cie. Luxemburg S.A. and Oppenheim Asset Management Services S.à r.l.. Hauck & Aufhäuser has been in the digital asset management business with Zeedin since 2018.

In March 2020 Hauck & Aufhäuser announced its intention to buy Bankhaus Lampe KG from the Oetker Group; its purchase was subject to approval by the competition authorities. When the transaction was completed in October 2021, the bank changed its name to Hauck Aufhäuser Lampe.

=== 2022–present: Hauck Aufhäuser Lampe ===
In May 2024, ABN Amro agreed to buy Hauck Aufhäuser Lampe (HAL) for 672 million euros ($730 million) from Fosun International. Some of HAL's units such as those that provide alternative investment fund management or fund administration services were not part of the acquisition.

=== Operating subsidiaries and ownership ===
- Hauck & Aufhäuser Fund Services S.A., Luxembourg
- Hauck & Aufhäuser Alternative Investment Services S.A., Luxembourg
- Hauck & Aufhäuser Fund Platforms S.A., Luxembourg
- Hauck & Aufhäuser Pension Trust GmbH, Frankfurt am Main
- H&A Global Investment Management GmbH, Frankfurt am Main (Minority holding)
- FidesKapital Gesellschaft für Kapitalbeteiligungen mbH, Munich
- Hauck Investment Management (Nanjing) Co., Ltd., Nanjing (China)
- Hauck Investment Management (Shanghai) Co. Ltd., Shanghai (China)

The list represents an excerpt. The complete list can be found in the current annual report.

== Literature ==
- Moser, Eva; Winkler, Richard (1995). Wegmarken: 125 Jahre Bankhaus H. Aufhäuser. Munich: R. Oldenbourg.

== Links ==
- Hauck & Aufhäuser Homepage
- Zeedin - digital asset management
- Hauck & Aufhäuser in the company database of BaFin
- Hauck & Aufhäuser Investment Banking
