= Titan Cement =

Greek materials company

Titan Cement Group. Όμιλος Τσιμέντων Τιτάν
- Type: S.A. (corporation)
- Traded as: Euronext Brussels: TITC; CAC All-Share
- ISIN: BE0974338700
- Industry: Cement and Building materials
- Founded: 1902 in Greece
- Founders: Nikolaos Canellopoulos
- Headquarters: Athens, Greece
- Area served: Europe, America, Middle East
- Key people: Dimitri Papalexopoulos (Chairman); Michael Colakides (Managing Director and Group CFO)
- Products: Cement construction aggregates ready mix concrete fly ash dry mortars building blocks
- Revenue: €1.607 billion (2020)
- Operating income: €286.2 million (2020)
- Net income: €37.451 million (2020)
- Total assets: €2.678 billion (2020)
- Total equity: €1.266 billion (2020)
- Owners: E.D.Y.V.E.M. Ltd (37.03%); Paul and Alexandra Canellopoulos Foundation (10.09%); FMR LLC (9.99%)
- Number of employees: 5,359 (2020)
- Website: www.titan-cement.com

TITAN Group is a Greek producer of cement and building materials, producing 27 million metric tons of cement a year and employing over 5,500 people.

TITAN is a participant in the UN Global Compact (UNGC) and a core member of CSR Europe the World Business Council for Sustainable Development (WBCSD) and the Global Cement and Concrete Association (GCCA).

The Group’s parent company is TITAN Cement International (TCI), a Belgian company listed on Euronext Brussels, Euronext Paris and Athens Exchange. TITAN Cement International became TITAN Group’s parent company following the successful completion of a Voluntary Share Exchange Offer submitted to the shareholders of TITAN Cement Company S.A., the Group’s former parent company, which is based in Greece. The statutory seat of TCI is in Brussels, while its seat of management is in Cyprus.

In December 2025, it was announced that Titan Cement Group had entered into an agreement to acquire 100% of Traçim Çimento Sanayi ve Ticaret A.Ş., a cement manufacturer based near Istanbul, Türkiye, for approximately US$190 million. The acquisition includes an integrated cement plant with an annual capacity of about 2.5 million tonnes and is intended to strengthen Titan’s operations in Western Türkiye while enhancing its export capabilities to neighbouring regions and the United States.

In January 2026, it was announced that Titan Group had completed the acquisition of Vracs de L’Estuaire, a cementitious materials business located at the Port of Le Havre in northern France. The transaction formed part of TITAN’s TITAN Forward 2029 strategy and expanded its French operations through the addition of a clinker grinding facility with a capacity of approximately 0.6 million tonnes per year.
