= Global Cement and Concrete Association =

International industry association

The Global Cement and Concrete Association is an international industry association that was established in 2018. As of 2018, organized and led by five major multinational cement companies, it represented about 35% of the global industry for Cement and Concrete. The association was formed mainly to coordinate markets to protect the interests of the multinational cement corporations and in part, because the industry wanted to participate in sustainable development conversations, participating in COP24 and COP25. The Organization published guidelines for sustainable cement in 2018.

== Members ==
As of July 2020, GCCA reported 40 members including:

- Asia Cement
- Breedon
- Buzzi Unicem
- Cementir Holding
- Cementos Argos
- Cementos Molins
- Cementos Pacasmayo
- Cementos Progreso
- Cemex
- China National Building Material
- Ciments De L’Atlas
- Çimsa Çimento
- Corporacion Moctezuma
- CRH
- Dalmia Cement
- Dangote
- Eurocement
- Grupo Cementos de Chihuahua
- Heidelberg Materials
- Holcim
- JSW Cement
- Medcem Madencilik
- Nesher Israel Cement Enterprises
- Orient Cement
- Schwenk Zement
- SECIL
- Shree Cement
- Siam Cement Group
- Taiheiyo Cement
- Taiwan Cement
- Titan Cement
- UltraTech Cement
- Unión Andina de Cementos
- Vassiliko Cement Works
- Vicat
- Votorantim
- West China Cement
- YTL Cement
