= Francesca McDonagh =

British-born Irish banker

- Born: Francesca Jane McDonagh; 1974 or 1975 (age 51–52); Wimbledon, London, United Kingdom
- Occupations: Banking executive; banker
- Title: CEO of Universal Investment

Francesca Jane McDonagh (born 1974 or 1975) is an Irish-British business executive and banker. Since January 2024, she is the chief executive officer (CEO) of German fund group Universal Investment. Prior to that, she served as the chief operating officer (COO) of Credit Suisse from September 2022 to September 2023 where she oversaw its acquisition by UBS, and as CEO of Bank of Ireland from October 2017 to August 2022.

== Education ==
McDonagh grew up in Croydon in London and attended Coloma Comprehensive Girls’ School in Croydon. She studied at Oxford University where she graduated with a Bachelor of Arts degree in Politics, Philosophy and Economics.

== Career ==
McDonagh joined Bank of Ireland from HSBC Group, where she held a number of senior management roles. She is the first female CEO of Bank of Ireland. She succeeded Richie Boucher as CEO in October 2017, who had served in the role since February 2009.

Bank of Ireland was the country’s only domestic lender to avoid nationalisation during the 2008 financial crisis. By 2013, the bank had returned €6 billion for the €4.8 billion State aid injection.

Early challenges in her role include the fallout of the tracker mortgage issue. McDonagh and the heads of the other five main Irish retail banks were called by Finance Minister Paschal Donohoe to discuss their respective plans on resolving the tracker mortgage issue that had impacted their customers.

McDonagh has stated her focus is on technological transformation, improvements in internal culture, and enhanced customer service across the Group. She has also promoted Bank of Ireland’s objective to reach 50:50 gender balance in management and leadership appointments by 2021. She was appointed Officer of the Order of the British Empire (OBE) in the 2017 Birthday Honours for services to banking.

On 26 April 2022, Bank of Ireland announced that McDonagh would step down as Group CEO in September. While she was initially appointed as Credit Suisse's head of Europe, Middle East and Africa, in September 2023 she joined as the bank's chief operating officer, where she devised and oversaw the implementation of a subsequent cost-restructuring program. In March 2023, when the acquisition of Credit Suisse by UBS was brokered by the Swiss government due to concerns of a collapse amid large customer fund withdrawals stemming from the 2023 United States banking crisis, she led Credit Suisse's integration team tasked with merging the banks.

McDonagh left Credit Suisse in September 2023 and was appointed as CEO of German fund group Universal Investment starting January 2024.

== Personal life ==
McDonagh, an Irish national, was born in Wimbledon, London, to an Irish father and Greek mother. McDonagh's paternal grandfather comes from the village of Carraroe in County Galway and her paternal grandmother is from County Laois.

She lives in Italy, with her husband, who is French and owns a patisserie business.
