= Cement, California =

Ghost town in California, United States

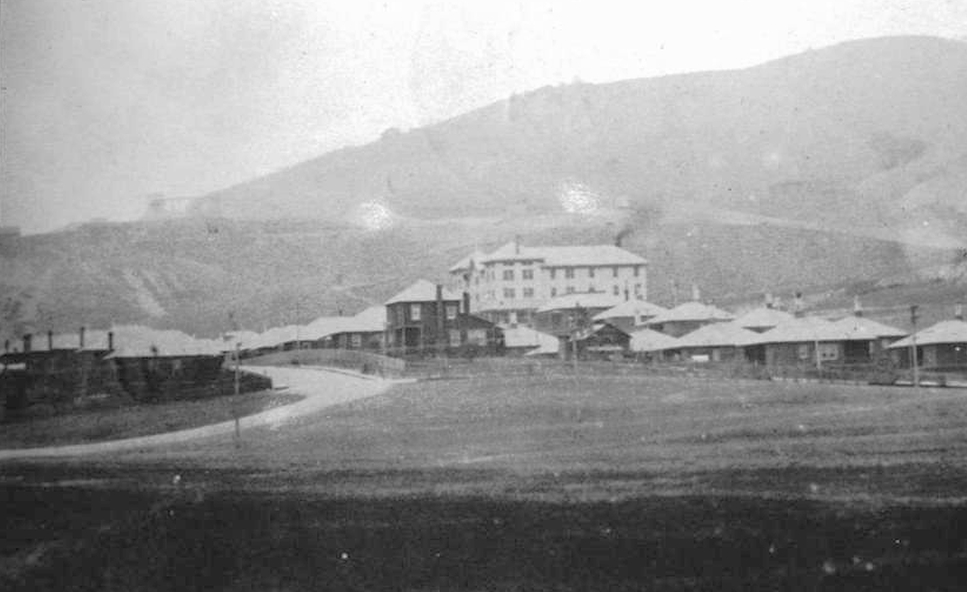
- The company town with its hotel, restaurant, bar, houses, and cement processing plant c. the 1920s

- Cement, California Cement, California (the United States)
- Coordinates: 38.298362°N 122.006609°W
- Country: United States
- State: California
- County: Solano
- Established: 1902
- Elevation: 673 ft (205 m)
- Access via Cement Hill Road

Cement is a mining and manufacturing ghost town in Solano County, California, United States now enveloped within the boundaries of the city of Fairfield. Cement was established as a company town at the turn of the 20th century and it quickly became a boomtown. It was founded and owned by the Pacific Portland Cement Company, which produced Portland cement that was bagged and labeled under the company's "Golden Gate" trademarked brand. It was shuttered in 1927, structures and equipment were auctioned off, and its remains are now in ruins or were moved away.

== History ==
The town of Cement was established in 1902 by the Pacific Portland Cement Company and was originally named after the large deposits of high-quality limestone rock deposits found in the area. This limestone was ideal for the lime that was needed for the production of Portland cement produced by the company at Cement.

Enormous conveyors, rock crushers, tube cement mills, and rotary kilns were created to process the raw quarried limestone.

The town also had its own open pit clay and gypsum mines with clay and gypsum being necessary components in the finished Portland cement the plant produced.

The establishment of the cement industry in Cement brought a large influx of workers to the area, and the town quickly grew into a thriving community of people with a strong economy. It became more populous than the three nearest cities combined – Fairfield, Vacaville and Suisun City.

The cement industry was the lifeblood of Cement for many years, and the town prospered as a result. The population of the town grew steadily to 500 people, and businesses and services were established to support the needs of the growing community. This included the three-story Golden Gate Hotel, hospital, restaurant, bar, livery stable, post office, telephone exchange, park, baseball diamond, general store, fire station, churches, and a grade school.

=== Railway ===
The town owners constructed a single-track standard-gauge steam railway to get products and supplies to and from Cement and Tolenas which were 1.6 miles (2.6 kilometers) away from each other. The company had a total of 6.3 miles (10.1 km) of track including yard and side tracks. The railway's name was Cement, Tolenas & Tidewater Railroad Company.

== Decline ==
The prosperity of Cement was not to last. As the limestone deposits were depleted, the industry in Cement began to decline, and the town's economy began to suffer.

Over time, the population of Cement continued to drop, and many of the town's businesses and services were forced to close. The town was finally sold off in 1927 for only a few thousand dollars. The once-thriving town became a shadow of its former self, and today it is a ghost town. The ruins of the town, including remnants of the old cement mill and the foundations of abandoned homes and buildings, stand as a testament to the once-prosperous community that was a center of the cement industry in California. The most prominent and visible concrete ruin on Cement's hillside is large and referred to locally as "The Castle." The Castle can be seen all the way from Interstate 80 in Fairfield.

== Present day ==
Despite its demise, Cement is an important part of California's history and culture. The remaining ruins serve as a reminder of the impact that the cement industry had on the region and the lives of its residents. Cement still interests people wondering about the history of the cement industry, the American West, the ghost town, and its past.

Cement is privately owned land and the owner's permission is required to visit the property that is approximately 600 acres (240 hectares).

== See also ==
- Le Hunt, Kansas
- Lime, Oregon
- List of ghost towns in California

== More reading ==
- Ghost towns of California: your guide to the hidden history and Old West haunts of California – Philip Varney, comprehensive overview of the history of ghost towns in California, ISBN 978-0760340820 (2012)
