= CRH plc =

Irish building materials company

- Type: Public
- Traded as: NYSE: CRH; S&P 500 component
- Industry: Building materials
- Predecessors: Cement Limited (1936); Roadstone Limited (1949)
- Founded: October 20, 1970; 55 years ago
- Headquarters: Dublin, Ireland; New York, United States
- Key people: Richie Boucher (Chairman); Jim Mintern (CEO)
- Products: Cement, aggregates, readymixed concrete, asphalt/bitumen and agricultural and/or chemical lime
- Revenue: ▲US$37.447 billion (2025)
- Operating income: ▲US$5.440 billion (2025)
- Net income: ▲US$3.753 billion (2025)
- Total assets: ▲US$58.329 billion (2025)
- Total equity: ▲US$24.004 billion (2025)
- Number of employees: 83,032 (2025)
- Website: crh.com

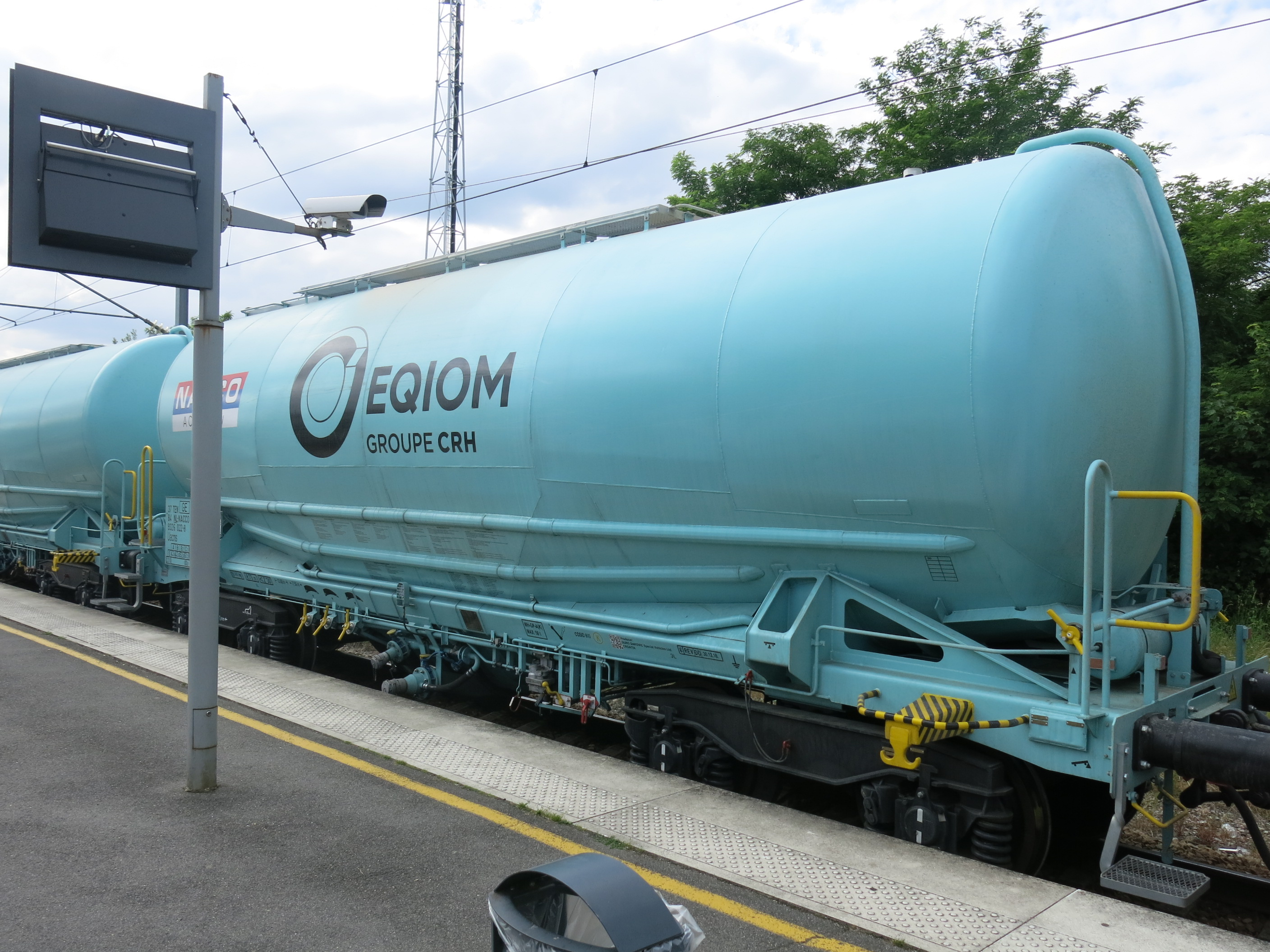
Cement transport wagon of French subsidiary EQIOM

CRH plc (an acronym for Cement Roadstone Holdings) is an American-Irish building materials provider headquartered in Dublin and New York, United States. CRH produces construction materials, primarily aggregates and cement, and manufactures ready-mixed concrete, asphalt concrete, and infrastructural components, of which it is one of the largest suppliers in North America. CRH operates 3,961 locations in 28 countries, including North America (75% of 2025 net income), Europe, Australia, and the Philippines.

In 2025, approximately 32% of revenues were derived from residential construction, 28% of revenues were derived from non-residential construction, and 40% of revenues were derived from infrastructure, while 60% of revenues came from new-builds and 40% came from repairs and remodels.

Some brands owned by the company include Ash Grove Cement Company, Oldcastle APG, Texas Materials, Cement Ożarów, Shelley Materials, Tarmac, Tilcon, Pike Industries, Equiom, Civilmart, Cemark, and Irish Cement.

The company is ranked 457th on the Fortune Global 500 and 290th on the Forbes Global 2000.

CRH is a founding member of the Global Cement and Concrete Association. The company's then CEO, Albert Manifold, was the GCCA's first president in 2018.

== History ==
=== 1970–1980s: formation and listings ===
CRH (Cement Roadstone Holdings) was established in 1970 through the merger of Cement Ltd (est. 1936) and Roadstone Ltd (est. 1949). The company listed on the Irish Stock Exchange in 1973.

CRH entered the United States market in 1978 by acquiring Amcor, a Utah-based concrete products group, which became Oldcastle Inc. The company expanded its U.S. presence in 1985 with the acquisition of Callanan Industries, a New York State aggregates producer.

=== 1990s: early Europe and US acquisitions ===
During the 1990s, CRH expanded into France through acquisitions including Raboni SA and Prefaest SA.

The company entered Eastern European markets in 1995 with the purchase of Holding Cement Polski in Poland, marking its first cement manufacturing operation outside Ireland. Further expansion included operations in Ukraine, including the purchase of Mykolaiv Cement and in Finland through the acquisition of Finnsementti Oy and Lohja Rudus Oy. In the U.S., acquisitions included Betco Block & Products Inc. of Bethesda, Maryland in 1990; Balf Co. in Connecticut, Lebanon Rock in Pennsylvania, Keating in Massachusetts and Sullivan Lafarge in New York state in 1994. CRH also acquired Allied Building Products, which specialized in roofing and cladding products and Tilcon, a major road construction specialist in the Northeast United States in 1996.

=== 2000–2010 ===
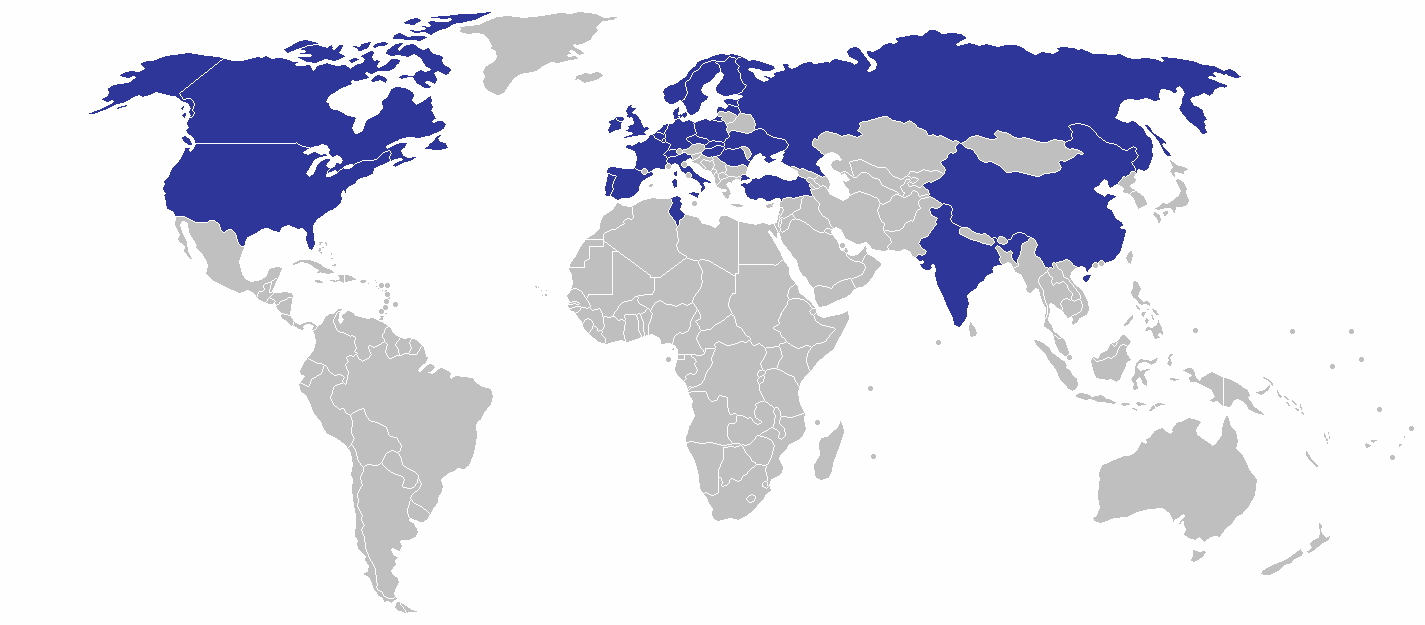
CRH global production sites in 2010.

The company entered Switzerland in 2000 with the €425 million purchase of Jura Group, adding cement, concrete and aggregates operations, as well as a regional distribution network. The following year, CRH acquired a 25% stake in Mashav, holding company for Nesher Israel Cement Works, the only cement producer in that country. In July 2003, the company bought Cementbouw - a do-it-yourself store chain and building materials producer in the Netherlands for €693 million. In 2004, CRH paid €429 million to purchase a 49% stake in Portuguese cement producer Secil. It sold that stake in 2012 for €574 million following a ruling on a shareholder dispute by an arbitration tribunal at the Paris-based International Chamber of Commerce.

CRH acquired Shelly Group of Ohio in 2000, Mount Hope Rock Products, based in New Jersey in 2002 and Ashland Paving And Construction (APAC) of Atlanta in 2006, the company's largest deal.

In 2007, CRH purchased four companies worth a total of $350 million (€251 million) to add to its US materials division: these companies were Conrad Yelvington Distributors Inc. (CYDI), Eugene Sand & Gravel, Cessford Construction and McMinn's Asphalt and Prospect Aggregates. Also in 2008, CRH agreed to purchase a landscape paver, Pavestone, for $540 million.

The company entered Asian markets with investments in China's Heilongjiang region by acquiring a 26% stake in the Jilin Yatai Group (2006) as well as 50% of India's My Home Industries Ltd (2008).

=== 2011–2019: Americas, Europe and emerging markets ===
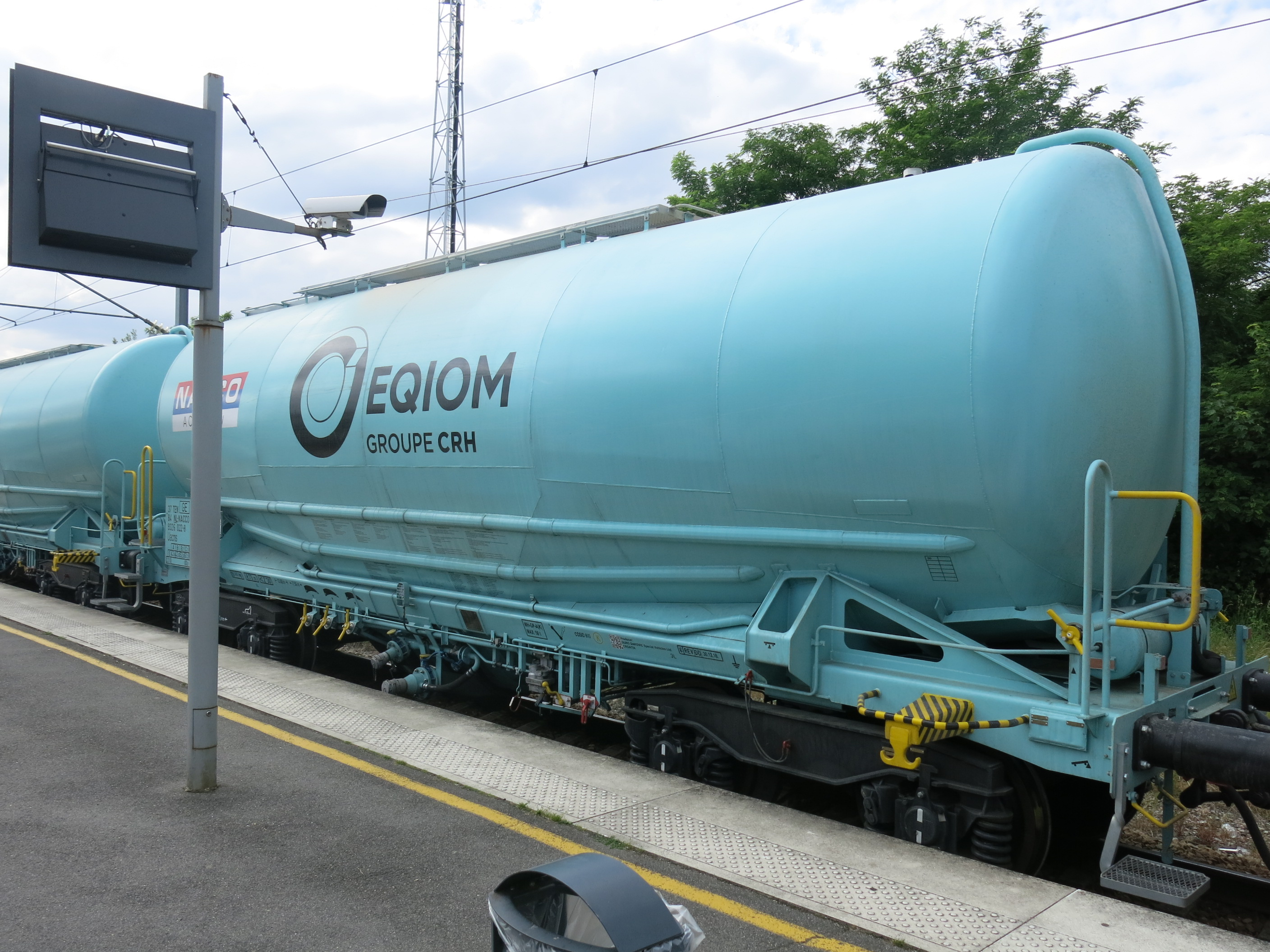
Cement transport wagon of the French subsidiary (EQIOM)

CRH confirmed in 2013 that it was interested in looking at other opportunities in India. In February 2015, the company acquired assets worth US$6.5 billion from LafargeHolcim, becoming the world's third-largest building materials group by market value. This acquisition almost tripled CRH's net debt, bringing it to €6.6 billion. In August 2015, CRH paid $1.3 billion for CR Laurence, a glazing company based in California. The acquisition complemented CRH's existing North American Building Envelope division, which employed 4,500 people at the time. By November 2015, CRH was getting about a fifth of its operating earnings from US infrastructure.

As of November 2016, half the asphalt, aggregates and assorted material it sold went to the United States. At that time, CRH was the biggest producer of asphalt in the US and the third largest producer of ready-mixed concrete according to the Financial Times.

As of 27 April 2017, CRH was Ireland's biggest company.

Over the earlier part of 2018, CRH spent €500 million on eight acquisitions. Also in 2017, CRH sold Allied Building Products to Beacon Roofing Supply for $2.6 billion. By the end of 2017, the biggest acquisition was Fels-Werke GmbH, a German leading lime and aggregates business with 1 billion tonnes of high-quality limestone reserves, 11 production locations, nine in Germany and one in both the Czech Republic and Russia.

In 2018, CRH purchased Ash Grove Cement Company, and in July 2019, CRH sold its underperforming European distribution arm to The Blackstone Group for €1.64 billion.

=== 2020s ===
In 2021, CRH invested $1.5 billion in twenty acquisitions, including Angel Brother Enterprises, a Texas-based asphalt paving and infrastructure company, and National Pipe & Plastics Inc., a New York-based manufacturer of water infrastructure and electrical conduit products.

In February 2022, CRH sold its Building Envelope business to KPS Capital Partners for $3.8 billion. In June, the company acquired Barette Outdoor Living, an Ohio-based manufacturer with ten U.S. facilities, from TorQuest Partners and Caisse de dépôt et placement du Québec for $1.9 billion.

Following a shareholder vote in June 2023, CRH transferred its primary stock listing from the London Stock Exchange to the New York Stock Exchange. In August 2023, the company expanded its Texas operations through the acquisition of cement and concrete assets from Martin Marietta Materials, Inc. The purchase included the Hunter Cement Plant, with a 2.1 million ton annual capacity, serving Austin and San Antonio markets, multiple terminals along Texas's eastern gulf coast, and twenty ready-mixed concrete plants.

In December 2023, CRH established a venture capital division, CRH Ventures, with a US$250 million fund. This unit focuses on investments in construction and climate technology companies.

=== Acquisitions ===
Date	Company	Price / Notes	Ref(s).
1978	Amcor	Utah-based concrete products group, which became Oldcastle Inc.	
1985	Callanan Industries	New York State-based aggregates producer	
1990	Betco Block & Products	Based in Bethesda, Maryland	
July 1994	Balf	Based in Connecticut	
July 1994	Lebanon Rock	Based in Pennsylvania	
July 1994	Keating	Based in Massachusetts	
July 1994	Sullivan Lafarge	Based in New York state	
July 1996	Allied Building Products	Specialized in roofing and cladding products; sold in 2019 to Blackstone Inc. for €1.64 billion	
September 1996	Tilcon	Seller was BTR plc; price was $329 million	
September 1998	Raboni and 80% of Prefaest	French companies; price was £14.3 million	
October 1998	Holding Cement Polski	Expansion to Eastern Europe; first cement manufacturing operation outside Ireland	
1999	Podilsky Cement	Based in Ukraine; €210 million invested in 2007 to cut carbon emissions; new kiln commissioned in 2011	
May 1999	Finnsementti and Lohja Rudus	Based in Finland; price was SEK3,550 million	
February 2000	Shelly Group	Based in Ohio; price was $362 million	
June 2000	Dolomite Group and Northern Ohio Paving Company		
November 2000	Jura Group	Entered Switzerland; Price was €425 million	
April 2001	Mount Hope Rock Products	New Jersey quarry firm; price was £138 million	
August 2001	25% of Mashav	Israel's only cement firm; price was $48 million; sold in 2016	
August 2001	Hallet Materials and Des Moines Asphalt & Paving Company	Price was $74.9 million	
September 2003	Cementbouw's building materials production, trade and retail activities	Based in Netherlands	
2004	49% stake in Secil	Portuguese cement producer; price was €429 million; sold to Semapa in 2012 for €574m	
2006	Harbin Sanling Cement Company, owner of a cement factory in Heilongjiang	Entered China market	
August 2006	Ashland Paving And Construction	Based in Atlanta; price was $1.3 billion, largest deal to date; seller was Ashland Global	
April 2007	5 plants in Northeast Ohio		
August 2007	Remaining 55% of Cementbouw	Total investment was €184 million	
September 2007	Conrad Yelvington Distributors, Eugene Sand & Gravel, Cessford Construction, and McMinn's Asphalt and Prospect Aggregates	Total price was $350 million	
November 2007	US Concrete's operations in Knoxville, Tennessee and Wyoming, Delaware	Price was $16.5 million	
March 2008	Pavestone	Landscape paver; price was $540 million	
March 2008	26% stake in Yatai Group's cement operation	Based in China; price was 2.13 billion yuan	
2008	50% of My Home Industries	Entered India; price was €290 million; sold in December 2019 for €300 million	
April 2013	Mykolaiv Cement	Based in Ukraine; price was €96 million	
August 2015	Assets from Holcim	Included Lafarge Tarmac; price was $6.5 billion; CRH became the third-largest building materials group	
August 2015	CR Laurence	Glazing company based in California; price was $1.3 billion	
June 2018	Ash Grove Cement Company	Cement manufacturer headquartered in Overland Park, Kansas; price was $3.5 billion	
2017	Fels-Werke GmbH	German lime and aggregates business; price was €600m, acquired from Xella; sold in 2023 for $1.1 billion	
October 2021	National Pipe & Plastics	PVC pipes for water and wastewater	
August 2021	Angel Brothers asphalt paving	Producer of asphalt, liquid asphalt, recycled concrete aggregates and asphalt paving	
June 2022	Barette Outdoor Living	Ohio-based manufacturer with ten U.S. facilities; price was $1.9 billion	
February 2024	Cement and concrete assets from Martin Marietta Materials	Included Hunter Cement Plant, with a 2.1 million ton annual capacity, serving Austin and San Antonio markets, multiple terminals along Texas's eastern gulf coast, and twenty ready-mixed concrete plants.	
July 2024	Ary Corporation	Provider of building materials headquartered in Canon City, Colorado	
November 2024	Dutra Materials	Asphalt production capabilities in northern California	
November 2024	Civilmart	Australian precast concrete products maker	
September 2025	Eco Material Technologies	North America's largest supplier of supplementary cementitious materials; price was $2.1 billion	
December 2025	North American Aggregates	Supplier of aggregates in New Jersey	

== Financial performance ==
The following is a summary of financial data:

	2025	2024	2023	2022	2021	2020	2019	2018	2017	2016	2015	2014	2013	2012	2011	2010	2009	2008	2007	2006	2005	2004
Currency	US$m	US$m	US$m	US$m	US$m	US$m	€m	€m	€m	€m	€m	€m	€m	€m	€m	€m	€m	€m	€m	€m	€m	€m
Revenue	37,447	35,572	34,949	32,723	30,981	27,587	25,129	26,790	27,563	27,104	23,635	18,912	18,031	18,659	18,081	17,173	17,373	20,887	20,992	18,737	14,449	12,755
EBITDA	7,596	6,723	5,819	5,651	5,350	4,630	4,000	3,365	3,310	3,130	2,219	1,641	1,475	1,640	1,656	1,615	1,803	2,665	2,860	2,456	1,957	1,740
Depreciation	2,156	1,798	1,633	1,644	1,691	1,624	1,442	1,071	1,006	1,032	887	680	725	748	742	786	794	781	739	664	556	516
Amortisation	0	0	0	113	74	743	64	117	66	71	55	44	650	47	43	131	54	43	35	25	9	4
EBIT	5,440	4,925	4,186	3,894	3,585	2,263	2,494	2,177	2,238	2,027	1,277	917	100	845	871	698	955	1,841	2,086	1,767	1,392	1,220
Profit on Disposals	0	0	0	(49)	119	9	(1)	(24)	59	55	101	77	26	230	55	55	26	69	57	40	20	11
Profit before Finance costs	5,440	4,925	4,186	3,845	3,704	2,272	2,493	2,153	2,297	2,082	1,378	994	126	1,075	926	753	981	1,910	2,143	1,807	1,412	1,231
Finance costs (net)	(635)	(211)	(172)	(376)	(417)	(490)	(438)	(351)	(349)	(383)	(389)	(288)	(297)	(289)	(257)	(247)	(297)	(343)	(303)	(252)	(159)	(146)
Associates	26	(108)	(17)	0	55	(118)	60	60	65	42	44	55	(44)	(112)	42	28	48	61	64	47	26	19
Profit Before Tax	4,831	4,606	3,997	3,469	3,342	1,664	2,115	1,862	2,013	1,741	1,033	761	(215)	674	711	534	732	1,628	1,904	1,602	1,279	1,104
Income Tax	(1,041)	(1,085)	(925)	(785)	(721)	(499)	(477)	(426)	(94)	(471)	(304)	(177)	(80)	(120)	(114)	(95)	(134)	(366)	(466)	(378)	(273)	(232)
Profit after tax	3,790	3,521	3,072	2,684	2,621	1,165	1,638	1,436	1,919	1,270	729	584	(295)	554	597	439	598	1,262	1,438	1,224	1,006	872

== Notable projects ==
Notable projects involving CRH materials and services include the resurfacing of the Silverstone Circuit, the Governor Mario M. Cuomo Bridge, the underground rainwater detention system at the Truist Park, repaving of the Crawlerway at the Kennedy Space Center, and expansion of the West Davis Highway in Utah.

== Structure ==
CRH is split into two Divisions, CRH Americas and CRH International. The Americas Division consists of two segments: Americas Materials Solutions and Americas Building Solutions. This division employs approximately 47,400 people, representing 59.1% of CRH's total workforce, and operates 2,008 locations which account for 57% of the company's global locations. These facilities are spread across 48 U.S. states and seven Canadian provinces.

== Environmental impact ==
In 2023, CRH introduced a Sustainability Framework addressing water management, circular economy, and decarbonization. The company reported processing 43.9 million metric tons of industrial byproducts and waste as raw materials and fuels, using 164 times more external waste than it produced.

In May 2024, CRH set a target to cut greenhouse gas emissions by 30% by 2030, aiming for net-zero emissions by 2050.

In November 2023, CRH signed a memorandum of understanding with Volvo to develop net-zero emissions vehicles and equipment used in construction.

CRH received an AAA rating from MSCI and an "A" rating from Carbon Disclosure Project (CDP) in 2023 for its reduction in greenhouse gas emissions.

== Philanthropy ==
In early 2024, CRH launched a five-year, $15 million program with UNICEF to improve access to vaccines against life-threatening diseases for over 1.2 million children.

== Legal issues ==
=== Anti-trust accusations ===
==== Poland ====
In Poland in 2007, CRH was fined €530,000 by the Polish Competition and Consumer Protection Commission for interfering with evidence that Polish authorities were gathering for a price-fixing investigation. In 2009, Grupa Ożarów (in which CRH first invested in 1995) was fined €26 million for operating a price fixing cartel in Poland. The Polish Competition Regulator stated that seven companies, which accounted for almost 100% of the market, had fixed minimum prices for grey cement and agreed on a market share for each operator. CRH has stated its belief that Ozarów operated an independent commercial policy in Poland and the fine was appealed. In December 2013, a Polish court upheld the fine.

==== Ireland ====
In Ireland in 1994, Irish Cement Limited, a wholly owned subsidiary of CRH, was determined by the European Commission to be part of price fixing and market sharing cartel across Europe which it said had illegally and artificially inflated the price of cement throughout the continent. A fine of over €3.5 million was levied.

In Ireland in 1996, High Court proceedings were initiated against CRH, its subsidiaries and two competitors in which the plaintiffs accused CRH and the others of operating a cartel and employing an illegal and anti-competitive eviction strategy in order to put them out of business.

In July 2012, the claim was dismissed on the basis of the "inordinate and inexcusable delay" in bringing forward any evidence in the case.

That judgement was appealed to the Supreme Court of Ireland in 2012. At the time of the appeal, it emerged that the presiding judge in the proceedings owned some shares in CRH and was forced to stand down. The appeals were dismissed by the court by 2014.

In 2005, opposition Teachta Dála (Irish member of parliament) Phil Hogan, who later became Minister for Environment, stated that "there is a widespread problem with competition in this economy... In the case of CRH, profits have been extracted from the Irish economy by means of a complex industry structure that is both anti-competitive and anti-consumer. The European Court of First Instance and finally the European Court of Justice have upheld findings of serious anti-competitive behaviour against CRH and other. While Sweden, Finland, UK, France and Germany have since levied huge fines against the cement industry, Ireland’s answer has been a stony silence."

In June 2012, TD Shane Ross urged an investigation into the company.

In February 2020, the Competition and Consumer Protection Commission closed its investigation into purchasing arrangements in the bagged cement sector and took no action due to lack of evidence.

==== United States ====
In 2006, in the case of Jensen Enterprises Inc. v. Oldcastle Precast, Inc., et al., an antitrust lawsuit was filed in California against CRH subsidiary Oldcastle Precast and three affiliates of AT&T. The defendants were alleged to have unreasonably restrained trade and conspired to monopolize telephone vaults for land-line connections. Plaintiffs challenged a contract requiring developers to purchase Oldcastle Precast product for properties served by AT&T infrastructure. They contended the arrangement led to Oldcastle Precast capturing northern California sales of precast electrical vaults, which were often placed concurrently with telephone structures. In 2010, an American Court of Appeal ruled that the plaintiff's counsel had failed to provide enough evidence to show that the defendants harmed competition in California and Nevada telephone vault markets.

In October 2009, a cement and concrete price fixing class action lawsuit was filed in Florida against Oldcastle Materials and others. The claim alleged that the defendants eliminated competition in the market for cement and concrete by charging artificially high prices from at least the period 2000 to 2009. The claim further alleged that the conspiracy was facilitated through in-personal meetings, telephone conversations and other communications. In 2008, the defendants announced uniform price increases for concrete and cement, bringing their prices to the same level at the same time, the lawsuit claimed. Then, in September, the defendants cut the price of concrete in an effort to lure customers away from independently owned concrete firms. The lawsuit stated that the practices alleged in the cement and concrete industry were clearly illegal. In 2012, the case was settled for undisclosed terms.

In April 2014, an Oldcastle Materials construction zone in Cleveland, Ohio was described as "ridiculously dangerous" in a lawsuit concerning the death of Randy Roginski on 27 July 2010. His family was awarded $19 million compensation and the CRH-related Shelly Company was fined $20 million in punitive damages.

In 2017, CRH was accused of exercising significant market power in West Virginia through a series of acquisitions and anticompetitive actions that increased prices for state road paving contracts in the three markets in the state between 2010 and 2014. Under a settlement reached in October 2020, CRH subsidiaries West Virginia Paving, Kelly Paving and American Asphalt made a combined, upfront payment of $30.35 million to governments and West Virginia Paving agreed to provide the state an additional $71 million in credits that can be applied to already completed, yet unpaid, road projects and future work over the following seven years.

=== Other allegations ===
==== Poland ====
In 2005, a Polish businessman, Marek Dochnal, alleged to a Polish Parliamentary Inquiry that he had arranged a bribe of almost $1 million for CRH to a former minister for privatisation, Wieslaw Kaczmarek, in connection with the privatisation of a cement plant at Ozarow, in central Poland, in 1995. CRH, which now owns and operates the cement plant at Ozarow, said the allegations were "without foundation".

It was also revealed in June 2005 that CRH contributed €125,000 to a charity founded by the wife of Poland's president, Jolanta Kwasniewska. Both CRH and the Polish first lady denied any sinister motive behind the transaction.

==== Ireland ====
In 2003, CRH was accused of making payments to Ireland's former Taoiseach Charles Haughey as details emerged of how Haughey received payments from various companies and businessmen in return for political favours. In 1969, Roadstone, later acquired by CRH, sold 80 acres of land to Haughey, the then Minister of Finance, for £120,000. In 1973, Haughey sold 17.5 acres of that land back to CRH for £140,000. Within four years, Haughey had made a net profit of £20,000 and 62.5 acres at CRH's expense.

Charles Haughey was offered chairmanship of CRH in 1972.

==== Ansbacher Bank ====
The existence of illegal offshore accounts first emerged in 1997 during the McCracken Tribunal set up to investigate reports of secret payments to former Taoiseach (Irish Prime Minister) Charles Haughey and former cabinet minister Michael Lowry.

The bank was founded in the 1970s and was being run by Des Traynor who was chairman of CRH from 1989 to 1994 and who ran his bank during that period out of CRH's registered office in Dublin's Fitzwilliam Square where the company provided an office for its chairman. Traynor was also personal financier to Charles Haughey.

During the investigation it materialised that Justice Moriarty held approximately £500,000 in CRH shares and while that in his opinion precluded him from investigating certain matters concerning CRH he was not, he said, precluded from inquiring into banking activities conducted from Des Traynor's offices at Fitzwilliam Square.

In 1999, as evidence on the scale of the Ansbacher accounts grew Tánaiste (Irish Deputy Prime Minister) and PD Minister Mary Harney asked the High Court to appoint inspectors who could identify the account holders.

The High Court Inspectors' report was published in June 2002. It found that eight out of fifteen CRH directors held Ansbacher accounts, including four former chairmen. It also concluded (Chapter 15, p. 189) that "CRH as a corporation cannot be said to have knowingly assisted in the carrying out of Ansbacher’s activities in Ireland".

After the publication of the report CRH acknowledged publicly that its then Chairman had "misused its facilities and personnel" which "represented a grave breach of trust by Mr Traynor".

==== Sale of Glen Ding Lands ====
In 1998, Dáil Éireann (Ireland's Parliament) voted against an investigation into why an asset with the potential to produce a yield of £48 million in terms of sand and gravel reserves was sold to Roadstone, a subsidiary company of CRH, without public tender for £1.25 million in 1991.

Many opposition members of parliament voiced concerns that at the time of sale, Charles Haughey was Taoiseach and his financier Des Traynor was Chairman of CRH. Dáil Éireann voted not to investigate whether CRH had donated funds to any political party or politician before or after the purchase of Glen Ding.

The State's Comptroller and Auditor General conducted an investigation into the sale and found that the competing bid fell "far short of" the Roadstone offer and that "The Department acted at all times in the best commercial interests of the State" (Section 9.6). It also noted "even though it is unlikely that the Roadstone offer would have been bettered. The attraction of concluding the sale at what was considered a good price outweighed the imperative to act evenhandedly which is a basic principle when the State is doing business". It was noted by the Department's Accounting Officer that the Roadstone offer "was more than 50% above the only alternative offer received", that another bidder "was afforded every opportunity" to make a better offer and that given subsequent delays and planning issues. "In retrospect the deal had proved to be exceptional".

The Glen Ding transaction was further investigated by the Moriarty Tribunal which in 2006 reported its conclusion "that there was no connection, directly or indirectly, between Charles Haughey and any aspect of the disposal, nor any connection between the operation of the Ansbacher accounts and any aspect of the disposal.
