= Recapitalization =

Reorganization of a company's capital structure

Recapitalization is a type of corporate reorganization involving substantial change in a company's capital structure. Recapitalization may be motivated by a number of reasons. Usually, the large part of equity is replaced with debt or vice versa. In more complicated transactions, mezzanine financing and other hybrid securities are involved.

== Leveraged recapitalization ==
One example of recapitalization is a leveraged recapitalization in which the company issues bonds to raise money and then buys back its own shares. Usually, current shareholders retain control. The reasons for such a recapitalization include:

- Desire of current shareholders to partially exit the investment
- Providing support of falling share price
- Disciplining the company that has excessive cash
- Protection from a hostile takeover
- Rebalancing positions within a holding company
- Help to improve the stock of the company during a time of poor economic conditions

== Leveraged buyout ==
Another example is a leveraged buyout, essentially a leveraged recapitalization initiated by an outside party. Usually, incumbent equity holders cede control. The reasons for this transaction may include:

- Getting control over the company via a friendly or hostile takeover
- Disciplining the company with excessive cash
- Creating shareholder value via gradual debt repayment

== Nationalization ==
Another example is a nationalization in which the nation in which the company is headquartered buys sufficient shares of the company to obtain a controlling interest. Usually, incumbent equity-holders lose control. The reasons for nationalization may include:

- Saving a very valuable company from bankruptcy
- Confiscation of assets
- Executing eminent domain

Nationalization is essentially a move by the nation of the company to acquire controlling interest in the company, either through buying majority shares with a motive to:

1. Eliminate dominance of the shareholders
2. Own controlling interest in the company

It can also be an attempt by the national government to rehabilitate its position financially by issuing bonds to increase public debt and meet immediate liabilities.
