= Brian Goggin (banker) =

Irish banker

- Occupation: Banker

Brian Goggin is an Irish banker and former CEO of the Bank of Ireland, Ireland's second largest bank.

He took over from Michael Soden in June 2004. He was due to retire in summer 2009 after forty years with Bank of Ireland. He instead retired in February 2009, two days before the Bank of Ireland robbery by which time Richie Boucher had replaced him.

After the crash, Goggin has joined US private equity firm Apollo Management an adviser.

He is also a Board Member of the Irish Heart Foundation.

His brother Colin is a convicted sex offender.
