= Credit Institutions (Financial Support) Act 2008 =

The Credit Institutions (Financial Support) Act 2008 (No. 18) is an Act of the Oireachtas (Irish parliament). It was emergency legislation passed by the Irish Government on Tuesday, 30 September 2008 and enacted on Thursday, 2 October to provide a €440 billion guarantee to six Irish banks to prevent possible collapse as a result of the 2008 financial crisis.

It was the first time since its foundation that the Seanad began debate on legislation after midnight, passing the bill at 8 a.m. on Thursday 2 October.

== Background ==
The decision to introduce the bill was made following Monday 29 September 2008, when the ISEQ fell a record 13%, when a number of banks in Europe were collapsing and the United States congress initially rejected their Emergency Economic Stabilization Act of 2008 and a subsequent record points-value fall in the Dow Jones Industrial Average.

There was a direct positive response on the liquidity markets on the day the bill was announced.

== Constitutionality ==
In Collins v Minister for Finance, the Supreme Court found that the Act was constitutional.

== Section 6 ==
The Credit Institutions (Financial Support) Scheme 2008 was made under powers conferred by section 6(4) of this Act.
