= Ash Grove Cement Company =

Cement company

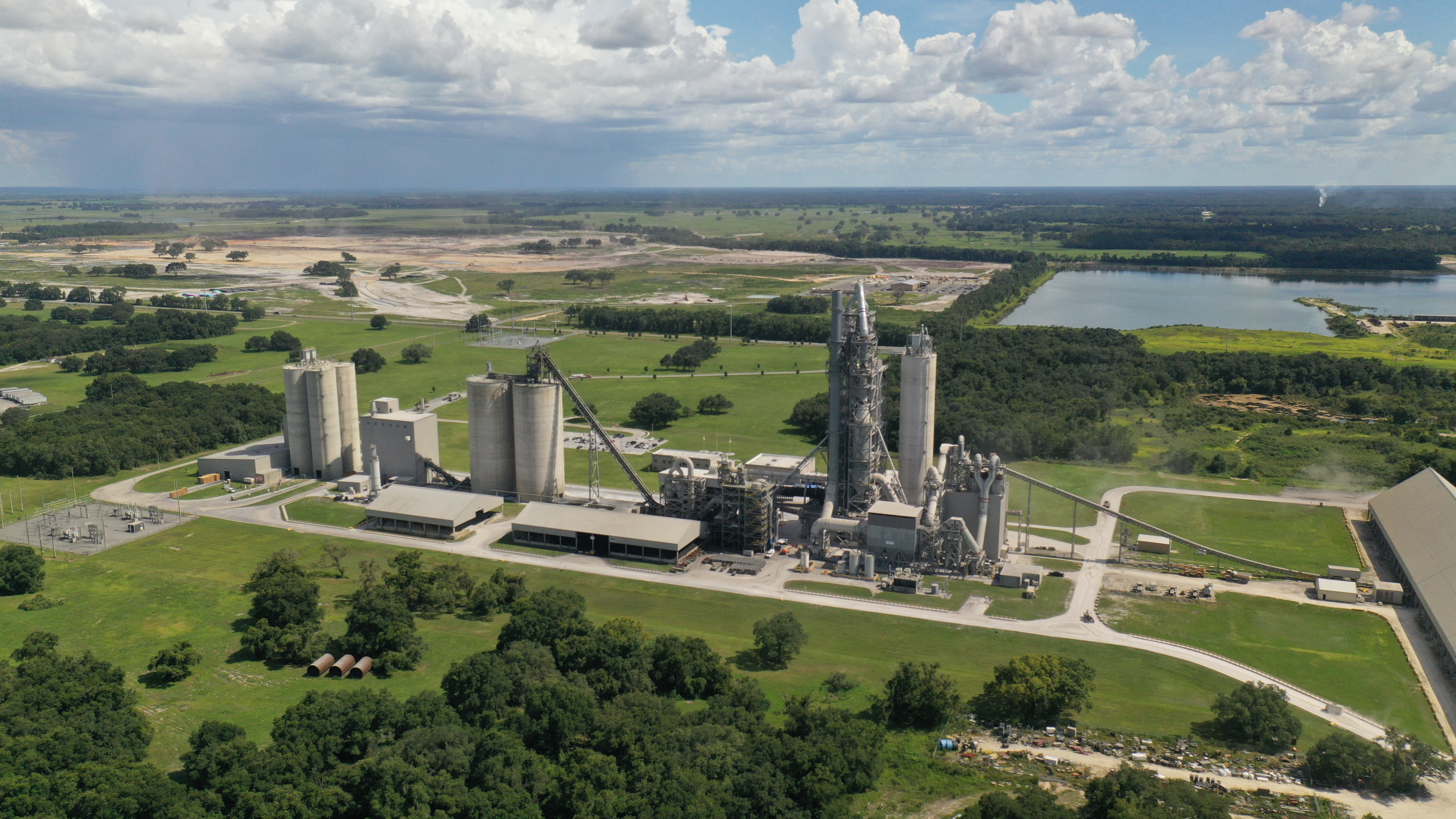
Ash Grove Cement Company Sumterville, FL plant.

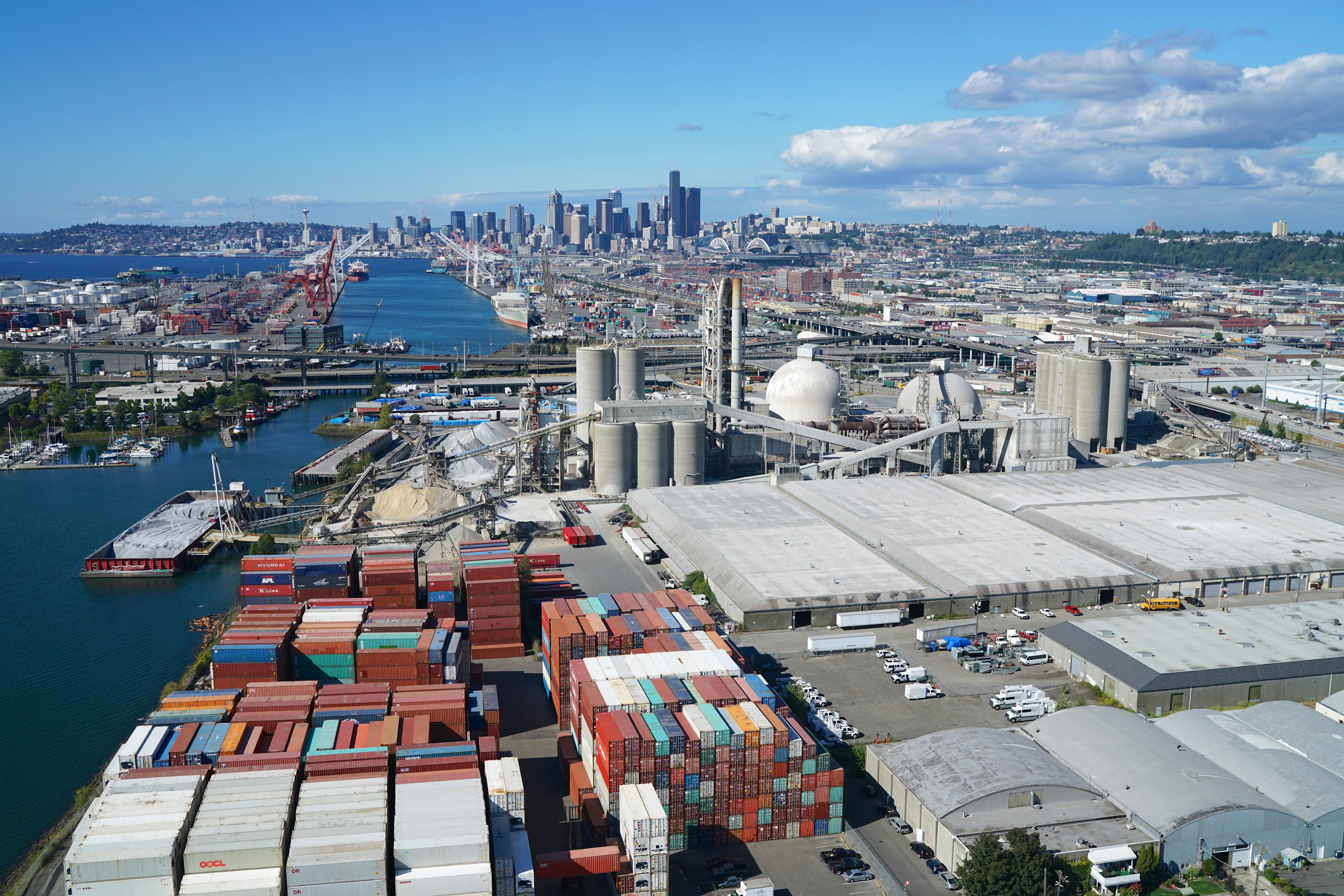
Ash Grove Seattle, WA plant

Ash Grove Cement Company is a cement manufacturer based in Overland Park, Kansas. It was the largest US-owned cement company until it was acquired in 2018 by CRH plc, a global building materials business headquartered in Ireland.

The company was established in 1882 at Ash Grove, Missouri, as the Ash Grove White Lime Association. It commenced cement manufacture in 1908, with a plant at Chanute, Kansas. It now has cement manufacturing capacity from 12 plants:

- Chanute, Kansas 37°41′53″N 95°27′36″W
- Durkee, Oregon 44°32′31″N 117°25′16″W
- Foreman, Arkansas 33°41′45″N 94°25′17″W
- Leamington, Utah 39°33′49″N 112°11′49″W
- Louisville, Nebraska 41°00′18″N 96°09′14″W
- Midlothian, Texas 32°31′14″N 97°00′20″W
- Montana City, Montana 46°32′38″N 111°55′17″W
- Seattle, Washington 47°34′05″N 122°20′35″W
- Branford, Florida
- Sumterville, Florida
- Mississauga, Ontario
- New Braunfels, Texas

The company makes Portland cements, fly ash cements, masonry cements, oilwell cements and soil stabilizers. It also operates a lime plant in Oregon, many ready-mix concrete plants in the Midwest, and a limestone quarry at Blubber Bay, Texada Island, British Columbia.

== Recent news ==
On October 20, 2017, Ash Grove announced that its stockholders had approved a plan for the company to be acquired by CRH plc, a global building materials business headquartered in Ireland.

On June 15, 2018, CRH plc announced that the U.S. Federal Trade Commission had issued its consent order for this transaction, thus completing the acquisition.
