= Richie Boucher =

Irish banker

Richie Boucher (aged 50 in 2009) is a former chief executive officer (CEO) of the Bank of Ireland, Ireland's largest bank. He was succeeded by Francesca McDonagh in October 2017, having taken on the role on 25 February 2009 from Brian Goggin, who resigned following the injection of Irish Government funds and the guarantee of deposits. His 2012 pay was €843,000.

== Career and education ==
Boucher was chief executive of Bank of Ireland's Irish Retail Division since January 2006 where he oversaw the company's land bank and development loans growing to €7.1 billion. He was appointed as a Director of the Group in October 2006. He joined the Bank of Ireland in December 2003 as chief executive of corporate Banking from the Royal Bank of Scotland where he was Regional managing director of corporate Banking, in London and South East England and previously held many prominent roles with the Ulster Bank Group and also worked in ICC Bank.

He was born in Kitwe in Northern Rhodesia (now Zambia) to Irish parents, his father being from Dublin and his mother being from County Cavan. He was primarily educated at St George's College, a Catholic boarding school in Salisbury in Southern Rhodesia (now Harare in Zimbabwe). He later attended Rockwell College, County Tipperary, and Trinity College, Dublin, where he graduated with a degree in business before pursuing a career in banking. He has never lost his distinctive Rhodesian/Southern African accent though he did spend his first seventeen years in Southern Africa.

== Evidence to Oireachtas ==
On 2 July 2008 he told the Oireachtas Finance Committee "unequivocally, we do not think there is a Northern Rock in Ireland", and the Central Bank here has stricter rules for how much ready cash banks must hold than any other country where the group does business.

"We do not believe that we have capital problems. The issues that we face are more down to liquidity rather than capital", and added there were no arrears on his bank's portfolio of 100% mortgages.

In January 2011, he admitted that information supplied to the Dáil on bank staff bonuses was both misleading and incorrect. Boucher accepted that Bank of Ireland was responsible for Minister for Finance Brian Lenihan putting erroneous information on the Dáil record to the effect that no performance-related bonuses were paid to staff. The following month a top civil servant accused Boucher of "hiding behind" words and misleading the government during a blazing row over the bonuses.

There were heated exchanges at a November 2012 Oireachtas finance committee meeting as Boucher would not answer repeated questions, including how much debt the bank had written off on unsustainable mortgages. Independent TD Stephen Donnelly accused Boucher of treating the committee with contempt by not answering questions. Fine Gael TD Kieran O'Donnell said his refusal to answer questions showed a "lack of moral compass" and that "nothing had changed". Chairman Labour TD Ciarán Lynch said he was being 'minimalist' in his answers and added it was unacceptable for Boucher or any banker to hide behind some "opaque notion of commercial confidentiality. What the Irish public demand is nothing short of full disclosure. Far from the impression that the committee was a witch hunt, we were entitled to get the information we asked for. Another committee member said the performance of Boucher was the epitome of arrogance, and likened his lack of engagement to a 'McCarthy-ite trial response'".

Following his appearance, the Sunday Independent said that "He is a hard bastard with a hide like a rhino" and is the "embodiment of all that is bad in Irish banking".

Subsequently, Labour TD Arthur Spring told Finance Minister Michael Noonan that he should seek the resignation of Boucher because his behaviour "could be damaging to the Bank of Ireland brand". Spring, a former Bank of Ireland official, also told Noonan, whose Government maintains a 15% stake in the Bank of Ireland, that he should canvass and build "alliances" with other investors on this issue.

== Relationship with property developers ==
He advised property developer Seán Dunne on his acquisition of the iconic Jury's hotel site in Ballsbridge. Speaking to Marian Finucane on RTÉ, Dunne recalled the days immediately after he agreed to purchase the Jury's site for €275m, which he planned to turn into the Knightsbridge of Ireland. "I phoned up a very good friend of mine, Richie Boucher. He's now deputy head of Bank of Ireland ... And, after about Wednesday, Richie said, 'Seán', he said, 'if I was trying to borrow the money you're trying to borrow, I wouldn't stay in Thailand. I'd come back to Dublin.' So I thought that was good advice, even though I wanted to stay in Thailand with my wife and son", Dunne recollected.

On 3 October 2007, the planning department in Dublin City Council received a letter from Boucher, giving his address as the office of chief executive of Bank of Ireland Group's retail financial services at the head office in Lower Baggot Street. it was headed "Jurys/Berkeley Court Site ... Dear Sir, I refer to the above and write to confirm my strong support for this landmark proposal which I believe will significantly benefit the city of Dublin and its citizens by helping enhance the concept of a living city and providing buildings of significant architectural merit befitting Ireland of the 21st century. Yours faithfully, Richie Boucher, chief executive, Retail Financial Services Ireland."

== Personality and appointment as chief executive ==
A banking analyst who has dealt with Boucher, and has observed BoI's changing fortunes over the past couple of years, said Boucher has a very strong personality. In that way, he would be a very different fish to his predecessor Brian Goggin. But he's a very personable guy outside work. Prem Watsa, chief executive of Fairfax, told Reuters the BoI boss was very disciplined, focused, very commercial".

Boucher competed with Des Crowley, the head of Bank of Ireland's UK business for the CEO's job. He was the board's unanimous choice to be chief executive and for his "expertise, determination and pragmatism, after an exhaustive process in Ireland and internationally, involving internal and external candidates."

Accepting the appointment, Boucher said he was "very conscious of the current state of the financial services industry, the low opinion which the general public has of banks and the very difficult economic conditions that we face". He said he fully accepted "that we have an uphill battle as we work towards restoring the trust and confidence of our customers, stockholders and the general public. It is my commitment that I will work relentlessly with my colleagues in Bank of Ireland to win this confidence".

In August 2011, Boucher retained the services of a US consultancy firm to help him prepare his submission for the Central Bank's review of whether legacy directors of bailed-out banks contributed to their institutions' demise and, if so, whether they are "fit and proper" to continue in their roles. 11 months later the Central Bank of Ireland issued a statement saying Boucher could continue in his role after passing the "Fitness and Probity" review.

== Reactions to appointment ==
Billionaire businessman Dermot Desmond, who was a substantial shareholder in the bank, wrote to all members of the board expressing his "dismay" at Boucher's appointment. He said Boucher was one of the most senior bankers in the organisation, as a director, chief executive of retail financial services, a member of the group risk policy committee and of the group investment committee."There has to be a direct correlation between Boucher's appointment to these senior positions and the excess lending policies of the bank."How did Mr Boucher and others within the bank view the warnings of the Central Bank of Ireland in 2004 concerning the overheated residential property market?” Desmond said the appointment of Boucher sent out "completely and utterly the wrong message. People who invested their pensions and savings in Bank of Ireland shares have been put under extreme financial pressure through absolutely no fault of their own. People are quite rightly angry."Credibility and confidence need to be restored. This will not be achieved by promoting existing management further up the chain ... [a] clean break is needed. The people who got the bank into the mess are not the people to get the bank out of the mess". Desmond said the bank's directors were seriously out of touch with market perception and the sentiments of shareholders, accountholders and the market generally if they thought otherwise. "Therefore [he] must have been responsible for fatal errors of judgment, including advancing loans to developers on the strength of overstated land values and insufficient security. He said he had nothing personal against Mr Boucher but perception was important if public confidence and the external reputation of the Irish banking system were to be restored."

The Labour party said the decision to appoint an internal candidate as chief executive is "most disappointing ... I am not in any way casting any aspersions on Mr Boucher's ability or integrity, but this is a missed opportunity to signal a new beginning in Irish banking", said spokeswoman on Finance, Joan Burton. Senator Shane Ross raised the appointment in the Senate and—while later admitting hyperbole—said "possibly the most disgraceful appointment in the business world in living memory."

== Personal life ==
He is married to Sandra Boucher, has two children, Katie and Keith and lives in Clontarf, Dublin. He is a first cousin of Eamon Delaney (their mothers were sisters). A rugby fan, he trains a children's rugby team. His basic salary is €690,000 (The Irish Government put a €500,000 salary cap on chief executives of state-guaranteed banks). Additionally, among other benefits, he has an annual car cash allowance of €34,000, and receives free tax advice in accordance with executive levels. The employment contract includes a permanent gagging clause.

As of 31 December 2009 he had €946,000 in loans from the Bank of Ireland, with €708,000 described as "other loans" and €235,000 in mortgage loans. In April 2010, following contact between the Taoiseach's department and the bank he waived his option to retire on pension at 55 and thus removed the need to top up his pension by €1.5m.
