= Universal Investment =

Private equity firm

- Company type: Limited company
- Industry: Investment funds
- Founded: 1968; 58 years ago
- Headquarters: Frankfurt, Germany
- Key people: Francesca McDonagh (CEO)
- AUM: €1.449 trillion (December 2025)
- Number of employees: 1,700 (2025)
- Website: www.universal-investment.com

Universal Investment Group is Europe’s leading third-party ManCo and fund services provider with more than EUR 1.4 trillion in assets under administration across 5,000 funds and structures. It employs a workforce of around 1,700 across offices in Frankfurt am Main, Luxembourg, Dublin, London, Paris, Stockholm, Krakow, and Singapore.

The UI Group provides services to institutional investors and asset managers across all asset classes, including securities, alternatives, and real estate. Universal Investment operates within the EU’s three largest fund hubs: Germany, Luxembourg, and Ireland. Its service offering spans the entire value chain, from fund structuring, management company and fund administration services to reporting and risk management solutions – alongside active distribution and marketing support.

Universal Investment was established in 1968 by several German private banks as a joint investment company. In 2016, the British private equity firm Montagu acquired the company from Berenberg and Bankhaus Lampe. In 2022, Canadian Pension Plan Investment Board became a minority shareholder.

== See also ==
- List of asset management firms
