= Holcim Group =

Swiss multinational building materials manufacturer

Holcim Limited
- Formerly: LafargeHolcim (2015–2021)
- Type: Public
- Traded as: SIX: HOLN; SMI component
- Industry: Building materials
- Founded: 10 July 2015
- Headquarters: Zug, Switzerland
- Number of locations: 2,301 operating sites (2021)
- Key people: Miljan Gutovic (CEO); Kim Fausing (chairman)
- Products: Cement, aggregates, concrete, and other building materials
- Revenue: ▼SFr 26.4 billion (2024)
- Operating income: ▲SFr 4.64 billion (2024)
- Net income: ▼SFr 3.04 billion (2024)
- Total assets: ▲SFr 54.3 billion (2024)
- Total equity: ▲SFr 27.2 billion (2024)
- Number of employees: 63,665 (2025)
- Divisions: Holcim; Lafarge; Elevate
- Subsidiaries: Hima Cement Limited; Holcim UK
- Website: holcim.com

The Holcim Group, legally known as Holcim Limited, (formerly known as LafargeHolcim) is a Swiss multinational company that manufactures building materials. It has a presence in around 45 countries, and employs around 48,300 employees. Holcim operates two business segments: building materials (decarbonized cement, circular aggregates) and building solutions (energy-efficient building systems, high performance concrete & surfacing).

Originally, the company was established as LafargeHolcim by the merger on 10 July 2015 of Holcim and Lafarge, which had combined sales of CHF 26.7 billion in 2019. In the 2020 Forbes Global 2000, it was ranked as the 280th largest public company in the world.

== History ==
The logo of LafargeHolcim from 2015 through 2021

On 7 April 2014, Lafarge and Holcim announced a merger project to create LafargeHolcim. With a combined market value exceeding $50 billion, the merger was the second largest announced worldwide in 2014. On 10 July 2015, the two companies completed the merger and created LafargeHolcim. On 15 July 2015, the new LafargeHolcim Group was officially launched.

In June 2016, Le Monde reported that Lafarge paid taxes to ISIS middlemen in 2013 to 2014 to keep using their factory in Jalabiya, Northeastern Syria. On 2 March 2017, the Board of Directors of LafargeHolcim issued a statement indicating that the measures required to continue operations at the plant were unacceptable.

A comprehensive and independent investigation revealed significant errors in judgment that were inconsistent with the company's code of conduct and the company took action. There have been significant changes and developments made to the compliance program and infrastructure since the time of the alleged misconduct.

The former CEO, Eric Olsen, resigned in April 2017 because of the "strong tensions" incurred by the news. However, an investigation conducted by Baker McKenzie concluded Olsen was not responsible for the payments.

In an interview with the French newspapers LeFigaro, Beat Hess, chairman of the board said: "Unacceptable errors were made that the Group regrets and condemns. It's far easier to say this in hindsight but the Group certainly pulled out of Syria too late. All of this should have been avoided".

Sherpa filed a lawsuit against Lafarge over the payments. In March 2017, French Foreign Minister Jean-Marc Ayrault criticized LafargeHolcim for competing to build the wall on the border of Mexico–United States border promised by President Donald Trump. They were also criticised by presidential candidate Emmanuel Macron.

In May 2017, Jan Jenisch was appointed as the new CEO of LafargeHolcim Group.

In May 2018, LafargeHolcim announced the next steps in the simplification of corporate organization. The corporate management positions in Switzerland will be moved to the company's Holderbank site and a new corporate office in Zug.

In January 2019, LafargeHolcim completed the sale of its 80.6% stake in PT Holcim Indonesia Tbk, its Indonesian cement business, to Semen Indonesia Group for US$1.41 billion.

During the summer, in July 2019, LafargeHolcim introduced Plants of Tomorrow, a four-year program that will see the utilization of automation technologies and robotics, artificial intelligence, predictive maintenance and digital-twin technologies across their entire cement production process.

In August 2019, the firm announced a "commercial breakthrough for low-carbon cement", Solidia Concrete, which "reduces the overall carbon footprint in precast concrete by 70%".

Later in the year, in Fall 2019, LafargeHolcim announced the allocation of 160 million Swiss francs ($161 million) on 80 projects across Europe to cut annual emissions from its cement manufacturing processes by 15% by 2022.

In September 2020, LafargeHolcim joins the Science Based Targets initiative (SBTi) “Business Ambition for 1.5°C” becoming the first global building materials company to sign the pledge with intermediate targets for 2030, validated by SBTi.

On May 4, 2021, shareholders voted on changing the company name back to Holcim. The new identity of the company, along with a new logo in green and blue, was launched on July 8, 2021. This name change applies only to the group company name with all market brands remaining in existence.

In September 2021, Holcim reached an agreement to sell its Brazilian cement business to Companhia Siderúrgica Nacional at an enterprise value of US$1.025 billion.

In May 2022, Adani Group acquired Holcim's stake in Ambuja Cements and ACC for US$10.5 billion. The sale marked Holcim's exit from India after 17 years of operations as part of a strategy to focus on core markets.

In January 2024, Holcim announced plans to spin off 100% of its North American operations and on June 23, 2025, the company completed this process, with the listing of Amrize. Holcim will remain listed on the SIX Swiss Exchange. Holcim will execute its strategy NextGen Growth 2030 unveiled in March 2025.

In October 2025, Holcim agreed to acquire Xella for €1.85 billion.

In April 2026, a French court found Lafarge guilty of financing terrorist groups in Syria after it paid millions of euros between 2013–2014, to organizations like ISIS and al-Nusra in order to keep its cement plant operating during the civil war. The court ruled these payments were driven by profit motives, effectively supporting extremist groups, and also convicted several former executives involved in the scheme.

== Operations ==
Headquartered in Switzerland and listed on the SIX Swiss Exchange, Holcim Group holds leading positions across Europe, Latin America, and Asia, Middle East & Africa.

Holcim operates in 45 countries.

The group employs 48,300 people around the world, and achieved pro forma net sales of CHF 16.3 billion (2024). Holcim's central functions had been divided between Zurich and Paris until the end of 2018, but are now located in Zug and Holderbank in Switzerland.

=== Elevate ===
Elevate
- Logo of Firestone Building Products until 2022
- Product type: Roofing, wall lining
- Current owner: Holcim Group
- Markets: Canada, Europe, Middle East, Asia, Latin America and the Caribbean
- Website: holcimelevate.com

Elevate, formerly Firestone Building Products, is a brand of roofing, wall and lining solutions of the Holcim Group. Elevate operates 21 manufacturing facilities in North America and produces single–ply and asphalt–based roofing membranes, polyiso insulation, and roofing accessories. It also has international facilities and support in Canada, Europe, Middle East, Asia, Latin America and the Caribbean.

On April 1, 2021, the Holcim group completed the acquisition of Firestone Building Products. On June 21, 2022, Holcim rebranded FSBP to became Elevate.

== Management ==
Miljan Gutovic has been Chief Executive Officer of Holcim since May 2024.

Members of the executive committee are formally appointed by the Board of Directors:

- Miljan Gutovic, Chief Executive Officer
- Steffen Kindler, Chief Financial Officer
- Grant Earnshow, Region Head West Europe
- Xavier Guesnu, Region Head Central and East Europe
- Martin Kriegner, Region Head Asia, Middle East & Africa
- Simon Kronenberg, Region Head Latin America
- Dragan Maksimovic, Group Head of Building Systems
- Virginie Darbo, Group Head of Strategy and M&A
- Carmen Diaz, Chief People and Sustainability Officer
- Ram Muthu, Group Head of Operational Excellence
- Alfonso Paradinas, Chief Marketing & Innovation Officer
- Alexia Sommer, Chief Communications Officer
- Lukas Studer, Group General Counsel

== See also ==
- Cemex
- Italcementi
- Eurocement group
- Votorantim Group
- CRH plc
- Semen Indonesia Group
- Heidelberg Materials (ex HeidelbergCement)
- Siam Cement Group
