= Holcim Foundation for Sustainable Construction =

Swiss non-profit organization

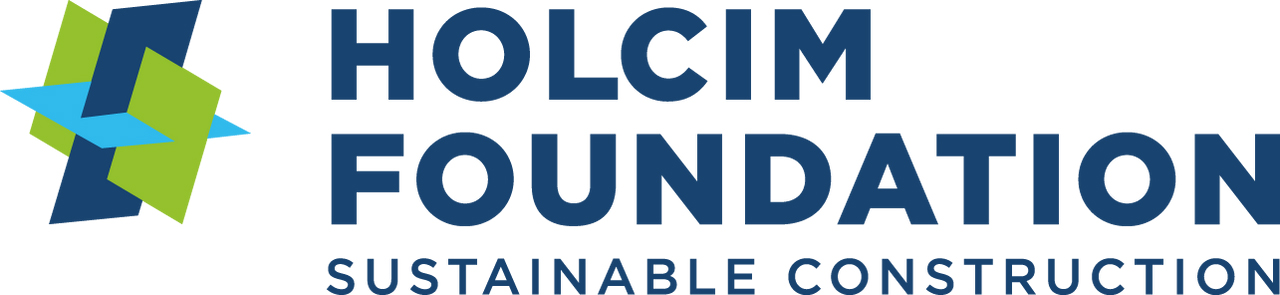
- Founded: 2003
- Founder: Holcim
- Type: Educational, promotional
- Headquarters: Hagenholzestrasse 83, 8050 Zurich, Switzerland
- Location: Holcim Foundation for Sustainable Construction, Hagenholzstrasse 83, CH-8050 Zurich, Switzerland
- Coordinates: 47°24′52″N 8°33′35″E
- Region served: Global
- Owner: Holcim Group
- Employees: 9
- Website: https://holcimfoundation.org

The Holcim Foundation for Sustainable Construction is a non-profit organization that promotes sustainable practices in the fields of architecture, engineering, urban planning, and construction. The Holcim Foundation has had six international award competition cycles, conducted more than 100 events, and produced 50 publications.

== History ==
The Holcim Foundation for Sustainable Construction was established in 2003 in Zurich, Switzerland, by Holcim Ltd, the foundation’s sole sponsor.

When Holcim Ltd and Lafarge S.A. completed their global merger and launched LafargeHolcim in July 2015, the foundation's name was changed to the LafargeHolcim Foundation for Sustainable Construction, and its key initiatives were renamed the LafargeHolcim Awards and LafargeHolcim Forum. In July 2021, following the rebranding of LafargeHolcim to Holcim, the foundation reverted to its original name, the Holcim Foundation for Sustainable Construction, and updated its branding and identity accordingly.

== Programs ==
The Holcim Foundation Awards for Sustainable Construction competition recognizes and promotes projects that combine sustainable design and construction with architectural excellence. The competition was held over a three-year cycle for the first six competition cycles. In addition to the main category prizes (Gold, Silver, Bronze, and Acknowledgement), an additional Next Generation category was open for students and young professionals not older than 30.

The Holcim Forum is a series of symposia focused on sustainable construction. It promotes interdisciplinary dialogue, brings forward new ideas, and examines potential solutions.

== Sources ==
- Schwarz, Edward; Leutenegger, Marius; Schadegg, Ernst; Wentz, Daniel (2005). Holcim Forum for Sustainable Construction 2004. Stäubli Verlag AG, Switzerland. ISBN 3-7266-0069-8.
- Wentz, Daniel (2005). Community center in South Africa. Stäubli Verlag AG, Switzerland. ISBN 978-3-7266-0082-2.
- Schwarz, Edward; Leutenegger, Marius; Siress, Cary (2006). Holcim Awards 2005/2006. Stäubli Verlag AG, Switzerland. ISBN 978-3-7266-0076-1.
- Schwarz, Edward; Wentz, Daniel (2006). Office building in Costa Rica. Stäubli Verlag AG, Switzerland. ISBN 978-3-7266-0075-4.
- Wentz, Daniel (2007). Research center in Switzerland. Stäubli Verlag AG, Switzerland. ISBN 978-3-7266-0079-2.
- Schwarz, Edward; Bratton, Denise L.; Leutenegger, Marius (2007). Urban Trans Formation. Stäubli Verlag AG, Switzerland. ISBN 978-3-7266-0080-8.
- Wentz, Daniel (2008). Office building in India. Stäubli Verlag AG, Switzerland. ISBN 978-3-7266-0083-9.
- Ruby, Ilka; Ruby, Andreas (2007). Urban Trans Formation. Idea Books, Amsterdam. ISBN 978-3-00-024878-8.
- Schwarz, Edward; Leutenegger, Marius; Jones, Kevin (2009). Holcim Awards 2008/2009. Stäubli Verlag AG, Switzerland. ISBN 978-3-7266-0084-6.
- Wentz, Daniel (2009). Clothing factory in Sri Lanka. Stäubli Verlag AG, Switzerland. ISBN 978-3-7266-0086-0.
- Wentz, Daniel (2010). IUCN Conservation Centre in Gland, Switzerland. Stäubli Verlag AG, Switzerland. ISBN 978-3-7266-0088-4.
- Schwarz, Edward; Leutenegger, Marius (2010). re-inventing construction. Stäubli Verlag AG, Switzerland. ISBN 978-3-7266-0090-7.
- Ruby, Ilka; Ruby, Andreas (2010). RE-INVENTING CONSTRUCTION. Ruby Press, Berlin, Switzerland. ISBN 978-3-9813436-2-5.
- Ruby, Ilka; Ruby, Andreas (2011). University building in France – Nantes School of Architecture. Stäubli Verlag AG, Switzerland. ISBN 978-3-7266-0092-1.
