= Archi Group =

Georgian real estate development company

Archi
- Native name: არქი
- Type: Private
- Industry: Real estate development; Hospitality
- Founded: 2006; 20 years ago
- Founder: Ilia Tsulaia
- Headquarters: Tbilisi, Georgia
- Area served: Georgia; Poland; United States
- Key people: Ilia Tsulaia (founder and chairman); Shio Khetsuriani (CEO)
- Products: Residential buildings; Mixed-use developments; Hotels and aparthotels
- Parent: Archi Hospitality
- Website: archi.ge/en/

Archi (Georgian: არქი), also known as Archi Group, is a real estate development company based in Tbilisi, Georgia. Founded in 2006, the company develops residential and mixed-use properties and operates aparthotels in Tbilisi and other parts of Georgia. It is the development business of the Archi holding, which has interests in real estate development, hospitality and investment. Its hotels and aparthotels are operated by Archi Hospitality.

According to reports published in 2026, Archi had a share of more than 18% of Georgia's residential development market. By that year, the company had completed more than 55 projects and had residents and investors from 30 countries, according to Forbes Georgia. In 2026, Archi was announced as a partner in the planned Trump Tower Tbilisi development; its chairman, Ilia Tsulaia, said that the company would be involved in the project.

The company is a member of the United Nations Global Compact Network Georgia and has also participated in environmental initiatives, including a tree-planting project in Rustavi.

== History ==
Archi was founded in 2006 by Ilia Tsulaia, a lawyer who had worked in administrative and civil law. It began as an investment and consulting business and moved into residential construction in 2008. As Archi expanded its operations, it took on further partners and investors. Meni Benish, an Israeli businessman who chairs the Israel–Georgia Chamber of Commerce, has been a partner in Archi since 2007. In 2017 the basketball player Zaza Pachulia became a partner in the company.

In 2021, Archi opened a factory near Tbilisi producing energy-efficient building blocks. The company developed the plant in partnership with Germany's Xella Group, the Partnership Fund and TBC Bank. The plant opened in September 2021 at a reported cost of 55 million lari. The project was intended to replace imports of YTONG products into Georgia. Archi later described the investment in the factory as approximately €15 million. In 2021 the company's founder, Ilia Tsulaia, said that Archi had used YTONG blocks, a brand of Xella, in its projects for the preceding seven years.

In 2022, Archi was among the winners at the Golden Brand business awards in Georgia.

In June 2024, Archi signed an agreement with Deloitte for the audit of its consolidated financial statements and those of its subsidiaries in accordance with International Financial Reporting Standards (IFRS).

In April 2025, members of Archi's management team participated in a two-day strategic leadership and marketing programme led by Das Narayandas of Harvard Business School. According to an employee survey published by Archi in 2026, the company's employee loyalty index was approximately 85%.

In September 2025, at the presentation of its Grand Avenue development, the company sold 644 apartments in five hours, which BM.GE reported as a record for the Georgian market.

By 2026, Archi had completed more than 55 projects, with a further 31 developments underway. Its projects included developments in Tbilisi and other locations in Georgia, including Batumi, Kobuleti, Rustavi and the Lake Sioni area.

In July 2026 Archi opened a joint office with the Georgian developer NEXT at The Warsaw HUB in Warsaw, Poland. The office was established to support investors interested in residential and hotel projects in Georgia. It was NEXT's third international office, after Dubai and Nairobi.

== Projects ==
In October 2024, Archi launched the Sioni Lake Resort & Spa project at Lake Sioni in Mtskheta-Mtianeti, approximately 50 kilometres (31 mi) from Tbilisi. Plans include a 126-room hotel, five aparthotels, villas, a spa, an aquapark and a lakeside boulevard.

In August 2025, Archi announced King Tamar, a mixed-use residential high-rise at 15 Merab Aleksidze Street in Tbilisi's Saburtalo district. The project was designed by the architect Wei Yap Ooi. The 32-storey building is planned to contain 278 apartments and is scheduled for completion in the third quarter of 2029.

Grand Avenue is a mixed-use development that Archi presented in September 2025 on the site of a former railway-carriage repair plant near Tsotne Dadiani Avenue and Dinamo Stadium in Tbilisi. The development is planned to include apartments, offices and co-working space, a school, a kindergarten, a museum and sports facilities, as well as a tunnel connecting the site with Tsereteli Avenue. Tsulaia estimated the investment in the project at $1 billion and said that 75% of the 20-hectare (49-acre) site would be allocated to landscaping. The footballers Khvicha Kvaratskhelia, Giorgi Mamardashvili and Tornike Shengelia became investors in the project.

In 2026, Archi and the Georgian developer NEXT announced Kobuleti Beach Resort, a planned $300 million hotel and residential development on Georgia's Black Sea coast, with a hotel under Accor's Swissôtel brand. The development is planned to comprise three buildings containing hotel rooms and apartments, together with conference facilities, restaurants and a 3,000-square-metre (32,000 sq ft) spa and fitness area. Construction began at a ceremony in Kobuleti on 3 June 2026 attended by Prime Minister Irakli Kobakhidze.

Archi has also announced its first development outside Georgia, a residential project near Miami, Florida. The project has been reported as involving an investment of approximately $50 million.

== International partnerships ==
Archi has entered into partnerships with international hotel operators, architecture firms, real estate developers and building-materials manufacturers.

In November 2024 Archi opened ibis Tbilisi City, a 156-room hotel in Tbilisi's Ortachala district. Accor described the hotel as its first project with Archi. The hotel was developed and is managed by Archi Hospitality.

In April 2026, the Trump Organization named Archi as a partner in the planned Trump Tower Tbilisi, alongside other Georgian companies and the US-based Sapir Organization. Designed by Gensler, the approximately 70-storey tower is intended to be Georgia's tallest building.

In May 2026 Archi announced a strategic partnership with BI Group, a real estate development company based in Kazakhstan. The agreement covered joint development projects in Georgia and the transfer of construction and digital practices between the companies.

Archi has also worked with international architecture and design firms on individual developments. The British architecture and planning practice Chapman Taylor was involved in the planning of the Sioni Lake resort, and its Madrid studio carried out architectural planning for the Kobuleti Beach Resort. The interiors of the Sioni hotel were designed by the London-based studio De Salles Flint.

In the building-materials sector, Archi partnered with the German company Xella in the development of a YTONG plant near Tbilisi. The plant produces energy-efficient building blocks and was opened in 2021.

== Energy efficiency ==
Archi has used YTONG autoclaved aerated concrete blocks in its construction projects since the mid-2010s. In a 2014 interview, the company's founder, Ilia Tsulaia, said that the material had lower thermal conductivity than conventional concrete and could reduce residents' energy costs by about 40%.

Archi developed a residential complex in Tbilisi through the EBRD's Green Economy Financing Facility (GEFF). According to the EBRD, its energy-efficient materials and systems reduced energy consumption by 43% compared with a conventional building.

In 2026, Archi signed a cooperation memorandum with the energy consultancy ENVIROS to review the thermal-envelope design of three residential blocks at its Archi Horizon complex in Tbilisi.

== Philanthropy and social initiatives ==
Archi donated GEL 10,000 following the June 2015 Tbilisi floods and provided food parcels to 500 socially vulnerable elderly households during a city-organised COVID-19 aid campaign in December 2020. In March 2022, following the Russian invasion of Ukraine, Archi allocated GEL 150,000 in humanitarian aid.

In 2024, Archi joined the Rezo Turnava Digital Education Fund, which provides technology training for disadvantaged people, and committed to offering employment to programme graduates. In 2026, Archi donated evergreen seedlings valued at more than GEL 200,000 to the city of Rustavi as part of a greening programme. Archi participates in the United Nations Global Compact and is a member of its Georgian network. The company has also participated in the #აჩუქეწიგნი book-donation campaign.

In January 2025, Archi's founder, Ilia Tsulaia, donated a house to a homeless family with several children at an annual New Year charity event in Samtredia held since 2012. Five families received homes at the event the following year.

In March 2026, amid instability in the Middle East, Tsulaia arranged a free charter flight for approximately 100 Georgian citizens from Muscat, Oman, to Tbilisi.
