= Tétreau =

Tétreau is a French surname. Notable people with the surname include:

- Édouard Tétreau (born 1970), French essayist, columnist, and political and economic consultant
- Nérée Tétreau (1842–1911), Canadian notary, landowner and political figure
