= Bruno Lafont =

French businessman (born 1956)

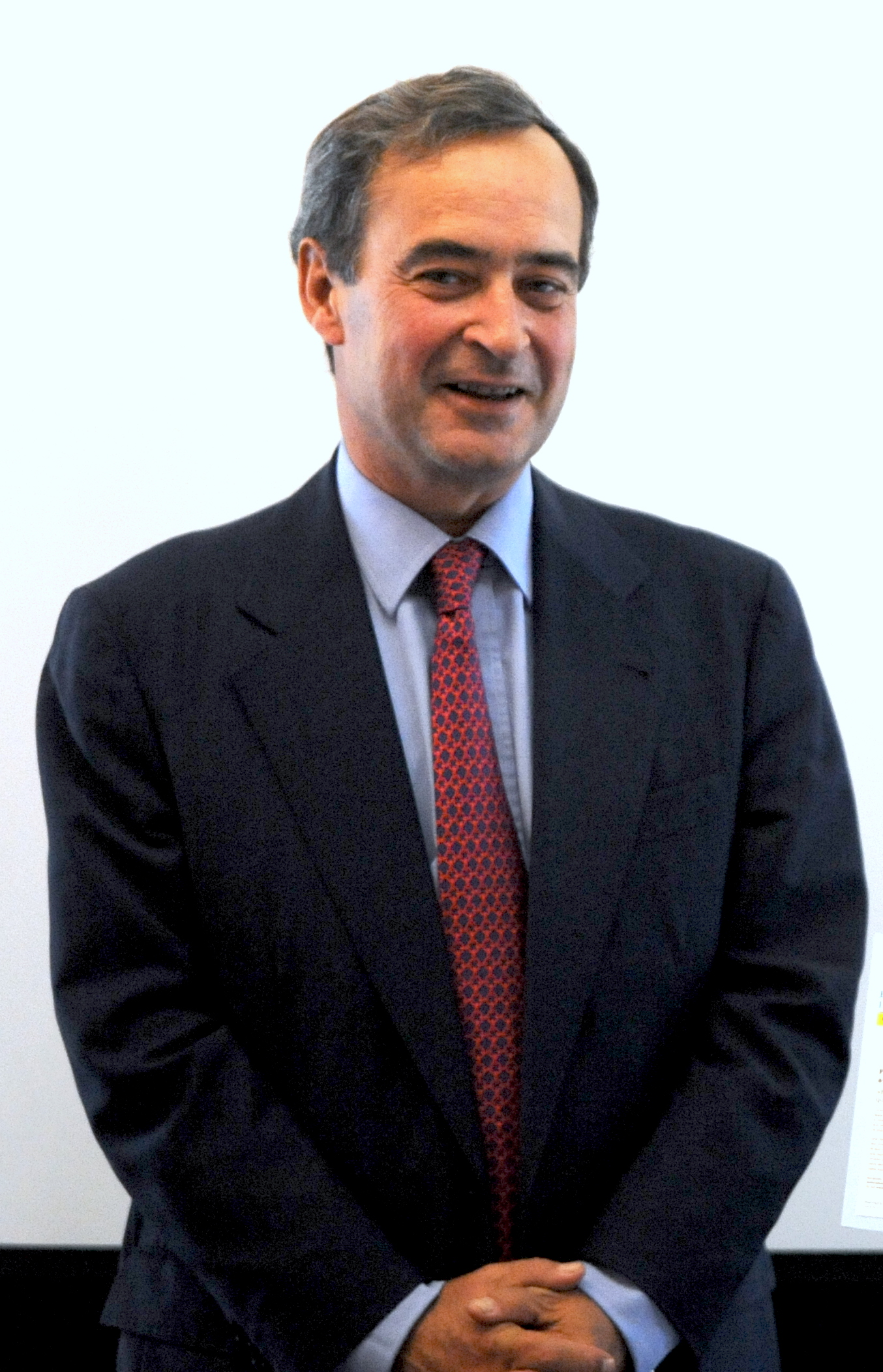
- Bruno Lafont in 2010
- Born: 8 June 1956 (age 70); Boulogne-Billancourt, France
- Education: Lycée Saint-Louis-de-Gonzague; Lycée Louis-le-Grand
- Alma mater: HEC Paris, ÉNA
- Occupation: CEO of Lafarge (2006-2015)
- Spouse: Marie-Constance de Maistre
- Children: 2

Bruno Lafont (born 8 June 1956) is a French businessman. He served as the chief executive officer of Lafarge from 2006 to 2015, when it merged with Holcim to become LafargeHolcim. He served as the co-chairman of LafargeHolcim from 2015 to April 2017.

== Early life ==
Lafont was born in 1956. He graduated from HEC Paris in 1977 as well as the École nationale d'administration in Paris.

== Career ==
Lafont joined Lafarge as an auditor in the finance department in 1983, He subsequently worked in Germany and Turkey. He was appointed as its CEO on 1 January 2006. Under his tenure, he oversaw the international expansion of Lafarge to 70 countries, including the acquisition of minority shareholders in Lafarge North America. Additionally, he cut costs by 60% within the first year, notably by divesting from its roof-manufacturing subsidiary. By December 2008, he acquired Orascom Cement, a subsidiary of Orascom Construction Industries, for €8.8 billion, and he brought billionaires Albert Frère and Nassef Sawiris to Lafarge's board. He stepped down as CEO in 2015, shortly after its merger with Holcim. He was awarded a €2.5 million bonus for it. He served as the co-chairman of LafargeHolcim until April 2017.

Lafont serves on the boards of directors of Électricité de France and ArcelorMittal. He is an advisor to the mayor of Chongqing in China. He is also the chairman of the Fondation nationale pour l'enseignement de la gestion.

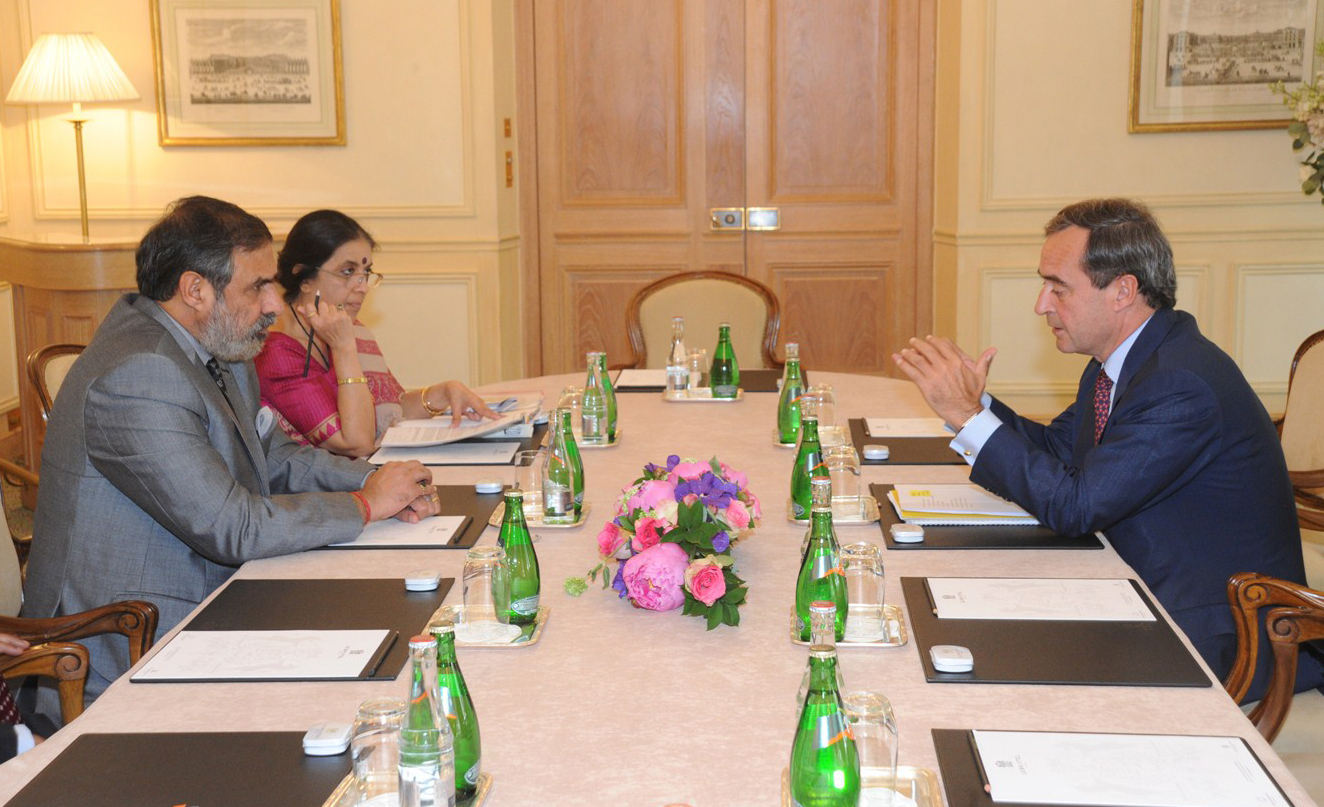
The Union Minister for Commerce & Industry, Anand Sharma, with the Chairman & CEO, Lafarge Group, Mr. Bruno Lafont, on the sidelines of the 6th India-France CEOs Forum, in Paris on July 08, 2013.

In April 2026, he was sentenced to six years in prison by a French court for paying millions in 'protection money' to Islamic State in Syria.

== Personal life ==
Lafont is married to Marie-Constance de Maistre, a violinist and a descendant of Joseph de Maistre.

== Works ==
- Lafont, Bruno (2016). Ces grandes entreprises au cœur des transformations du monde : entretiens avec Philippe Hardouin. Paris: Tallandier. ISBN 9791021019263. OCLC 946576283.
