= Charles-Édouard Bouée =

French businessman

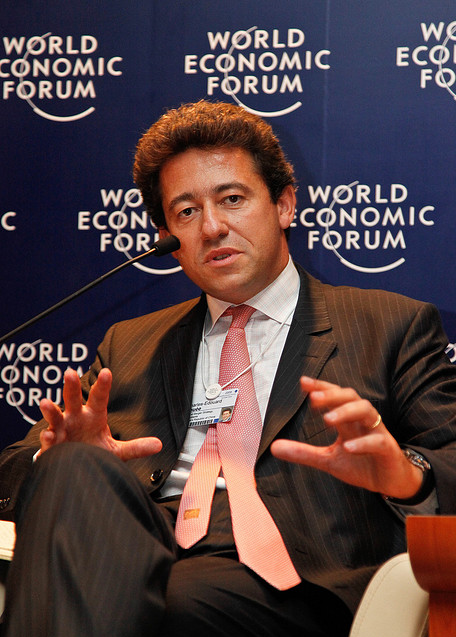
World Economic Forum 2009 - Charles-Édouard Bouée

Charles-Édouard Bouée (born 17 May 1969 in France) is a French businessman. He is the co-founder and managing partner of Adagia Partners, a European MidCap Private Equity firm which he co-founded with Nicolas Holzman and Sylvain Berger-Duquene. Adagia focuses on midcap buyouts in Healthcare, Business Services and Tech.

He is also co-founder, with Antoine Blondeau, of Artificial Intelligence Quartermaster (AIQ), a global platform for Artificial Intelligence Investment, Advisory and Innovation.

From 28 June 2014 until 10 September 2019, he was the chief executive officer of Roland Berger; he announced his resignation on 7 June 2019. He remains affiliated with the firm as a Strategic Advisor.

== Biography ==
=== Education ===
He studied at the lycée Saint-Louis-de-Gonzague, from which he graduated in 1986. He also holds a master's degree in engineering from École centrale Paris (ECP), a law degree from the Paris-Sud University, and in 1995, he earned an MBA from Harvard Business School.

=== Career ===
Charles-Edouard Bouée started his professional career as an investment banker at Société Générale in Paris and London, focussing on M&A and Corporate Finance. He then became an Associate at Booz Allen & Hamilton. Between 1997 and 2001, Charles-Edouard Bouée acted as vice president at the strategy consultancy AT Kearney.

In 2001, Charles-Edouard Bouée joined Roland Berger as a senior partner in the Paris office where he managed the Financial Services and Energy competence centres. From 2006, he was responsible for the group's activities in China, and in 2009, he was appointed president of the group in Asia. He became a member of Roland Berger's Executive Committee in 2010 where he was responsible for France, Belgium, Italy, Spain and Morocco. In July 2013, he was appointed Chief Operating Officer (COO), and in June 2014 he was elected global CEO of the group. In June 2018, he was re-elected by firms’ partners to lead Roland Berger for a 4-year term, after transforming the firm and leading it to a record year in terms of revenue. He resigned from his position on 7 June 2019. Today, he acts as a senior advisor for the company.

In 2016, when he was CEO of Roland Berger, he initiated and co-founded B & Capital, an independent fund dedicated to supporting French SMEs, raising over €200 million He has also been an advisor to the venture capital fund Balderton Capital since 2017.

In 2012, he was awarded the "Golden Magnolia" by the Mayor of Shanghai.

== Other activities ==
Charles-Édouard Bouée is engaged in various professional and civil society organizations in Europe as well as in China or the United States; for example, he is involved in the Global Artificial Intelligence Council of the World Economic Forum since June 2019, and in the China Europe International Business School. He has been a member of the Harvard Business School Alumni Board from 2015 to 2019, as well as a member of the Advisory Council of the Cheung Kong Graduate School of Business (CKGSB). From 2017 until 2021, he was also a member of the BMW Foundation's "Refocusing Europe" Advisory Board.

He has written numerous books on management, China, and Artificial Intelligence. Charles-Edouard Bouée is regularly interviewed in the media and is consulted as an expert on these subjects. He is also a regular contributor and commentator on global economy news for the newspaper Les Echos.

== Mandates ==
Co-chair of the Positive AI Economic Futures project, Global AI Council, World Economic Forum since June 2019.

Member of the International Advisory Board of China Europe International Business School since April 2018.

French Foreign Trade Advisor (Conseiller du commerce extérieur de la France) for Hong Kong since 2018.

Former Board member of the European Union Chamber of Commerce in China.

== Honors ==
Knight of the Legion of Honor (Chevalier de la Légion d'honneur), 2017.

Shanghai Magnolia Gold Award, 2012.
