= Lafarge scandal =

2010s ISIS-related allegations against French industrial company

The Lafarge scandal refers to the court case against Lafarge, a French cement company, for making payments to the armed militant groups Islamic State of Iraq and Levant and al-Nusra Front between 2013–2014. The scandal was first revealed by French journalist Dorothée Myriam Kellou and was then followed by investigations by the French government. Similar investigations into the company were held by the American government, which found it guilty of complicity in crimes against humanity and ordered it to pay $777.8 million over the issue.

== Background ==
According to The New York Times, a representative of the French construction company Lafarge S.A. met with representatives of numerous militias from northern Syria in Gaziantep in the autumn of 2012, a city in southern Turkey, to negotiate an agreement. Executives from Lafarge agreed to pay militant organizations like the Islamic State on a monthly basis in order to protect their business. The extremists offered to stifle competition and provided papers to the company's drivers, assuring safe passage for its cargo. The company was continuing payments even though the Islamic State was capturing, torturing, and killing prisoners. In August 2014, about a month after the Islamic State executed the American journalist James M. Foley, executives arranged the delivery of financial advances to the group as part of their agreement to keep the facility operating, according to emails seized by the U.S. authorities.

In June 2016, France launched an investigation into Lafarge's activities in Syria in response to reports by a French journalist, Dorothée Myriam Kellou. Kellou's reports were published by Le Monde and France 24 and revealed deals Lafarge made with a variety of armed groups, including the Islamic State of Iraq and the Levant (ISIL), in order to keep its cement plant in Syria operational. On September 19, 2014, ISIL took control of the factory. LafargeHolcim executives were investigated in 2017 for these claims in the civil and criminal courts. That action followed a complaint filed in November by Sherpa, a nongovernmental organization, accusing Lafarge of involvement in war crimes by conducting business with the Islamic State in order to keep its Syria facility operating, despite UN sanctions against the group.

The French court inquiry discovered that between 2012 and 2014, the business paid up to 13 million euros (approximately $17.5 million at the time) to various armed groups, including the Islamic State, via its Syrian subsidiary, Lafarge Cement Syria. According to the study, the subsidiary paid these payments to maintain its cement facility in northeastern Syria operational despite the continuous fighting, kidnappings, and security concerns experienced by its workers. Lafarge tried to dismiss the claims that the payments were made not to support ISIS, but to allow Lafarge to continue commercial operations, and stated that the business and its executives could not be held liable for the actions of its Syrian subsidiary. Initially, the Paris Court of Appeals agreed with Lafarge.

In 2018, eight former firm leaders, including two former CEOs, were charged with supporting terrorists and endangering the lives of their employees in Syria. All of those executives resigned, and the firm merged in 2015 with the Swiss cement conglomerate Holcim. The former officials may face up to 10 years in jail if proven guilty of the accusation.

== French legal proceedings ==
On 7 September 2021, the charges of financing terrorism and endangering employees' lives was confirmed by the Court of Cassation. The company attempted to dismiss the court decision that it had complicity against humanity, an appeal which was rejected by a Paris court. The Court of Cassation quashed the Court of Appeal ruling, determining that there was sufficient evidence, including minutes from Lafarge meetings, for the investigative judge to find Lafarge had "precise knowledge" of the nature of ISIS's activities. In the decision, the Supreme Court explained that "Crimes against humanity are the most serious of crimes because beyond the attack on the individual, which it transcends, it targets and denies humanity." It found that for a conviction on complicity in crimes against humanity, Lafarge did not need to be a part of ISIS but "It is sufficient that [the accused] has knowledge that the main perpetrators are committing or are about to commit such a crime against humanity and that by his aid or assistance, he facilitates the preparation or the commission thereof." The Court concluded that "the knowing payment of a sum of several million dollars to an organization whose object is only criminal is sufficient to characterize complicity by aiding and abetting." The Supreme Court referred the matter back to the Court of Appeal.

On 18 May 2022, the Investigative Chamber of the Paris Court of Appeals rejected a request by Lafarge to dismiss charges of complicity in crimes against humanity and endangering lives. In confirming the charges, the Court of Appeal judges found that "although informed that the actions of ISIS could constitute crimes against humanity, Lafarge, which could have put an end to the activities of LCS by asking it to close the plant, decided instead to continue this activity … even if it meant paying several million dollars to its groups". The Paris Appeals Court's decision against Lafarge marks the first time a company has been charged as a legal entity in France for complicity in violations of human rights.

In a statement, Lafarge said it strongly disagreed with the Court of Appeal's decision to retain complicity in crimes against humanity within the scope of an investigation and said it would appeal the decision to France's Supreme Court.

On 13 April 2026, the French court found Lafarge guilty of financing terrorist groups in Syria after it paid millions of euros between 2013–2014, to organizations like ISIS and al-Nusra in order to keep its cement plant operating during the civil war. The court ruled these payments were driven by profit motives, effectively supporting extremist groups, and also convicted several former executives involved in the scheme.

== American legal proceedings ==
On 17 October 2022, the United States Department of Justice reached a $777.8 million criminal plea agreement with Lafarge in the case. Executives with Lafarge "accepted responsibility" over paying $5.92 million to Islamic State and al-Nusra Front leaders and urging them to help the company keep its production facilities running, according to a company spokesman and law enforcement official.
