= Lycée Saint-Louis-de-Gonzague =

Catholic, Jesuit school in Paris, France

Coordinates: 48°51′34″N 2°17′09″E

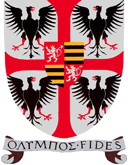

Location
- 12 rue Benjamin-Franklin; Paris, France

Information
- Type: Catholic, Jesuit
- Motto: Des hommes et des femmes avec et pour les autres (Men and women with and for others)
- Established: 1894; 132 years ago
- Principal: Jérôme Widemann
- Teaching staff: 150
- Grades: Ages 10 through 20
- Gender: Coeducational (since 1980)
- Enrollment: 1980
- Nickname: Franklinois
- Website: http://www.franklinparis.com/

The Lycée Saint-Louis-de-Gonzague (Franklin), founded in 1894, is a highly selective Roman Catholic, Jesuit school in the 16th arrondissement of Paris. It is regarded as the most prestigious French private school and has been ranked #1 lycée in France in the ranking of the newspaper Le Figaro.

== History ==
The “Petit Externat du Trocadéro” was inaugurated on September 28, 1894. The last Jesuit school established in the capital, it is the only one remaining after the closing of the colleges on Madrid and Vaugirard streets. It has enlarged little by little through real estate transactions in the immediate neighbourhood. At its inception in 1895 enrollment was 75 in classes 5 through 10. By 1898 enrollment was 220 pupils. Enrollment dropped due to the laws of 1901 but remained open without authorization. By 1920 enrollment reached 885 pupils. In 1920 an alumni association was formed. Anticlerical laws led to lawsuit payments that in 1923 almost led to the sale of Franklin.

On the initiative of its director, Fr. François Berlier de Vauplane, the Franklin Street campus was rebuilt between 1933 and 1935 by the architect Henry Violet. The vault contains a fresco representing the principal episodes in the life of St. Aloysius Gonzaga, the work of Henri de Maistre, prominent French painter of religious art. This contributed to its registration as a historic building in 1993. There are three recreation spaces on the roofs of the buildings, and a table tennis room and gymnasium in basement. During the Second World War manpower fluctuated and classes were held in the cellars at Franklin or Cup streets. In 1942, an elementary school was opened on Louis-David street. By the end of the war in 1945, Franklin counted 1,100 students. Many new courses were added in 1950 and by 1956 the staff numbered about 100. In 1968, Miss de Follin was named director of the elementary school. In 1969, a layperson was named prefect of the college and the number of Jesuits decreased. By 1978 there were 9 Jesuits and 86 lay teachers. In 1980 Franklin began admitting girls. First Lady Designate of France, Brigitte Macron, until recently, taught as a high-school teacher.

== Organization ==
The Jesuit school includes

- an elementary school (école primaire) (3 to 10 years old)
- a middle school (collège) with about 600 students (10 to 15 years old)
- a high school (lycée) with about 500 students (15 to 18 years old)
- a classes préparatoires with about 160 students (18 to 20 years old)

The elementary school is at 15, rue Louis David, while the middle school, high school, and preparatory classes are at 12, rue Benjamin Franklin. Both of these locations are in the 16th arrondissement of Paris.

== Academic results ==
Saint-Louis-de-Gonzague School is highly selective and is regularly ranked among the top lycées in France in various national rankings.

In 2012, the school ranked second nationwide with 64% of students receiving "Mention Très Bien" ("Highest Honors") at the Baccalaureat, the Lycée Henri-IV being ranked first.

In 2013, 76% of students received "Mention Très Bien" at the Baccalaureat, (compared to 59% at Lycée Henri-IV).

In 2016, achieved record number of 92% of the students received the "Mention Très Bien", which placed Saint-Louis-de-Gonzague as the best school in France.

== Alumni ==
Saint-Louis-de-Gonzague School has a number of alumni involved in government and business:

Politics

- Bruno Le Maire
- Michel Poniatowski
- Luc Chatel
- Louis de Guiringaud
- Jean-François Deniau
- Xavier Deniau
- Henri Plagnol
- Georges Tron
- Xavier de La Chevalerie
- Seán MacBride

Professors

- Brigitte Macron, non alumnus.
- Louis Boisgibault

Business

- Baudouin Prot
- Charles-Édouard Bouée
- Bruno Lafont
- Xavier Fontanet
- Jacques-Antoine Granjon
- François Villeroy de Galhau
- Édouard Tétreau
- Sindika Dokolo

Writers and Artists

- Michel Galabru
- Antoine de Margerie
- François Sureau
- Aliette de Bodard
- Bruno Latour

Religion

- Guy Thomazeau
- Charles Vandame

Sports

- Yves du Manoir
- Henry Chavancy

Military

- Honoré d'Estienne d'Orves
- Jacques Massu

Journalists

- Léa Salamé

The school alumni network is called the "Association des anciens élèves". and it counts more than 14.500 members.

== Graduates' destinations ==
The majority of students choose to pursue their studies in classes préparatoires such as Lycée Sainte-Geneviève, Collège Stanislas, or Lycée Janson-de-Sailly. They then usually move on to top French Grande École such as HEC Paris, ESSEC, ESCP (for business and management studies), or École Polytechnique, CentraleSupélec (for engineering and science studies). Franklin has also a high rate of admission to Sciences Po Paris, where students follow public policy and social science studies. Students who wish to study law are usually admitted to the Panthéon-Assas University, or for a medical degree they are admitted to the Université Paris Cité, both considered the best in France in their field. A few students also go to top international universities in Switzerland (EPFL), Italy (Bocconi), or England (Imperial College, UCL, KCL, LSE).

== See also ==
- Catholic Church in France
- Education in France
- List of schools in France
- List of Jesuit schools
