= Juan Gallardo =

Mexican businessman

Juan Gallardo Thurlow
- Born: Juan Ignacio Gallardo Thurlow; July 27, 1947; Los Angeles, California, U.S.
- Occupation: Businessman
- Years active: 1974-????

Juan Ignacio Gallardo Thurlow (July 27 1947) is a Mexican businessman.

== Career ==
Gallardo Thurlow is a chairman of Grupo Embotelladoras Unidas (bottling), chairman of Mexico Fund Inc. (mutual fund), and vice chairman of Home Mart de México (retail trade). He is former chairman and CEO of Grupo Azucarero México (sugar mills).

Other directorships he has held: Caterpillar Inc.; NADRO, Grupo México (mining) and Lafarge (construction). Gallardo has been a director of Caterpillar since 1998. His worth is estimated at US$1.4 billion.
