= Holcim Foundation Awards for Sustainable Construction =

Swiss-based competition

- Awarded for: Exemplary projects in sustainable design and construction
- Country: International
- Presented by: Holcim Foundation for Sustainable Construction
- Reward: Total USD 1 million
- First award: 2005
- Website: holcimfoundation.org/awards

The Holcim Foundation Awards for Sustainable Construction is an international competition for projects that contribute to sustainable construction and the transformation of the building sector, conducted by the Holcim Foundation for Sustainable Construction. A total of US$1 million in prize money is awarded in each two-year cycle.

== History ==
The competition was known as the Holcim Awards for Sustainable Construction from 2004. Holcim Ltd and Lafarge S.A. completed their global merger and launched Holcim in July 2015. The name of the foundation was changed to LafargeHolcim Foundation, and the competition became the LafargeHolcim Awards. Once the group dropped Lafarge from its name, the Foundation also adopted the new naming. For the 2025 competition, the name was changed to the Holcim Foundation Awards.

Since 2023, there is only one category within the competition: The Holcim Foundation Awards is open to architects, planners, engineers, and project owners that showcase sustainable responses to technological, environmental, socioeconomic and cultural issues affective contemporary building and construction. Until the 6th cycle, the Next Generation category was open for students and young professionals not older than 30. The category was seeking visionary design concepts and bold ideas including design studio and research work.

== Process ==
Submissions are evaluated by independent juries, using the Foundation's "four goals" to define sustainable construction: uplifting places, healthy planet, viable economics, and thriving communities.

The independent juries consist of experts from architecture, engineering, planning, and the construction industry. The juries for 2025 will be chaired by Sou Fujimoto (Japan), Kjetil Thorsen (Europe), Sandra Barclay (Latin America), Lina Ghotmeh (Middle East & Africa) and Jeanne Gang (North America).

The total prize money for each cycle of the Holcim Foundation Awards competition is US$1 million.

== Sources ==
- Wentz, Daniel (2005). Community center in South Africa. Stäubli Verlag AG, Switzerland. ISBN 978-3-7266-0082-2.
- Schwarz, Edward; Leutenegger, Marius; Siress, Cary (2006). Holcim Awards 2005/2006. Stäubli Verlag AG, Switzerland. ISBN 978-3-7266-0076-1.
- Schwarz, Edward; Wentz, Daniel (2006). Office building in Costa Rica. Stäubli Verlag AG, Switzerland. ISBN 978-3-7266-0075-4.
- Wentz, Daniel (2007). Research center in Switzerland. Stäubli Verlag AG, Switzerland. ISBN 978-3-7266-0079-2.
- Wentz, Daniel (2008). Office building in India. Stäubli Verlag AG, Switzerland. ISBN 978-3-7266-0083-9.
- Schwarz, Edward; Leutenegger, Marius; Jones, Kevin (2009). Holcim Awards 2008/2009. Stäubli Verlag AG, Switzerland. ISBN 978-3-7266-0084-6.
- Wentz, Daniel (2009). Clothing factory in Sri Lanka. Stäubli Verlag AG, Switzerland. ISBN 978-3-7266-0086-0.
- Wentz, Daniel (2010). IUCN Conservation Centre in Gland, Switzerland. Stäubli Verlag AG, Switzerland. ISBN 978-3-7266-0088-4.
