= Jan Jenisch =

German business executive (born 1966)

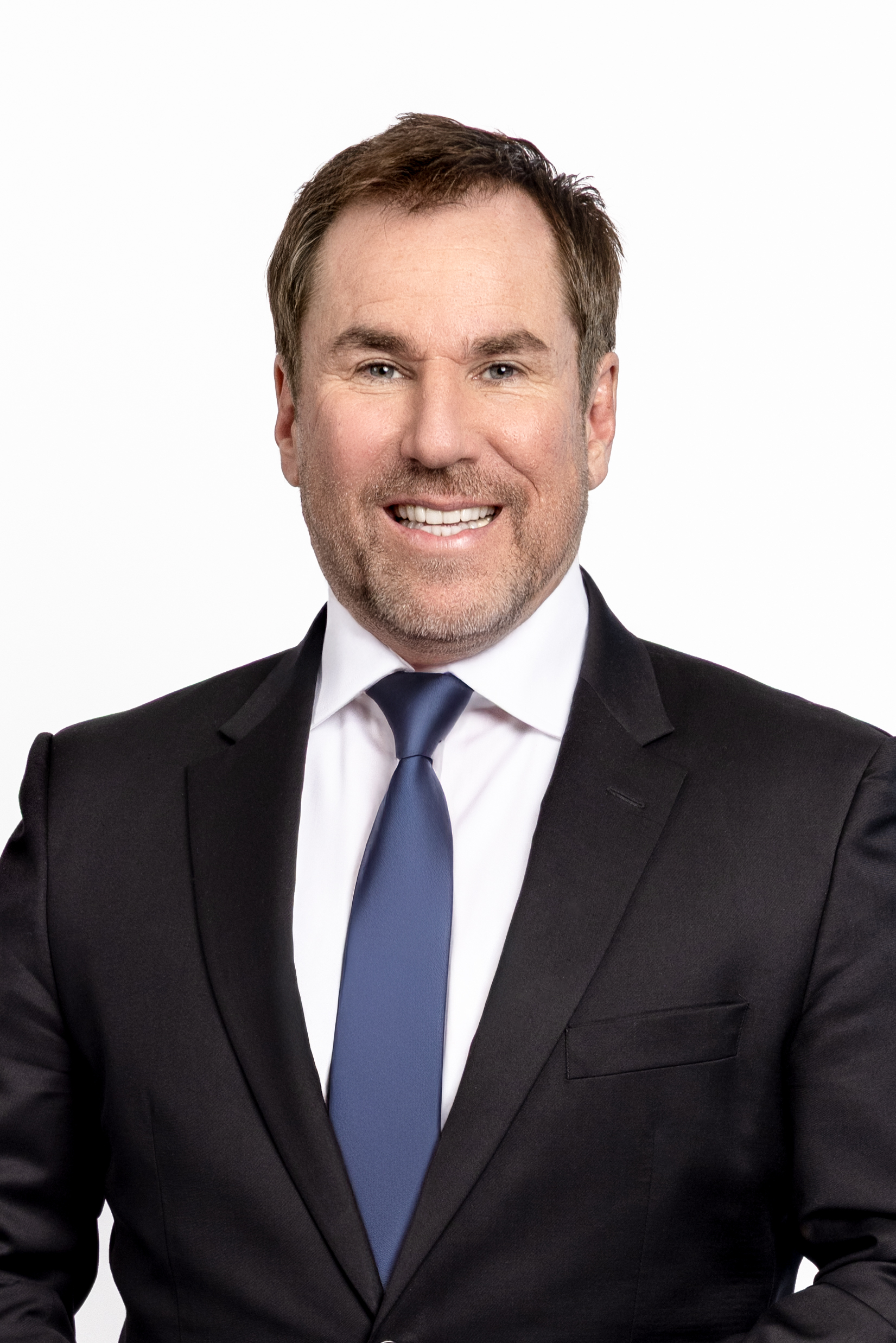
- Jenisch in 2025
- Born: 1966 (age 59–60); Denzlingen, Germany
- Education: University of Fribourg
- Height: 188 cm (6 ft 2 in)
- Children: 2

Jan Jenisch is a business executive and the chair and chief executive officer (CEO) of Amrize. He became the company's chair and CEO when Amrize, previously the North American division of Holcim, spun off and became an independent publicly traded company in 2025. Prior to Amrize, Jenisch was the chair of Holcim's board of directors from 2023 to 2025 and was the CEO of Holcim from 2017 to 2024. Prior to Holcim, he was the CEO of Sika AG.

== Early life and education ==
Jan Jenisch was born in Denzlingen in 1966, and raised in Freiburg im Breisgau, in the German state of Baden-Württemberg. He studied business administration in Switzerland, where he attended the University of Fribourg, and at Stetson University in the U.S. state of Florida. He earned a Master of Business Administration degree from the University of Fribourg in 1993.

In 2021, Jenisch received an honorary doctorate from the University of Fribourg, where he has also taught business seminars.

== Career ==
Jenisch's first chief executive officer (CEO) role was leading the Swiss specialty chemical company Sika AG. He joined Sika in 1996 and started as CEO in January 2012.

Jenisch was Holcim's CEO from September 2017 to 2024, adding the role of chair in 2023.

In January 2025, Holcim appointed Jenisch the chair and CEO of a North American corporate spin-off. Leading up to the spin-off, North American annual sales of $11.7 billion were nearly half of Holcim's overall sales.

The new business, Amrize, listed on the New York Stock Exchange and the SIX Swiss Exchange, on June 23, 2025.

== Board memberships ==
In addition to his board service at Holcim and Amrize, Jenisch was the president of the Global Cement and Concrete Association from 2021 to 2023. He has been a member of the European Round Table for Industry and the executive committee of the World Business Council for Sustainable Development, as well as a vice president of the Swiss-Japanese Chamber of Commerce. He has been a director of the private and public companies Glas Troesch and Schweiter Technologies, respectively.
