= Eric Olsen (businessman) =

American-French business executive

- Born: United States
- Education: University of Colorado Boulder; HEC Paris
- Occupation: Business executive

Eric Olsen is an American-French business executive who served as the Chief Executive Officer of LafargeHolcim, a construction public corporation, until 2017.

== Early life ==
Eric Olsen was born in Easton, Pennsylvania, and moved to Chicago, Illinois, at a young age.

Olsen graduated from the University of Colorado Boulder in 1986. He received a Masters in business administration from HEC Paris.

== Career ==
Olsen started his career at Deloitte. He later worked for Paribas and Trinity Associates.

Olsen joined Lafarge North America in 1999. He became its chief financial officer in 2004. Three years later, in 2007, he was promoted as head of human resources for Lafarge, which had 71,000 employees in more than 70 countries. Olsen helped integrate employees of the Orascom Group, acquired by Lafarge in 2007, and reorganised the group in 2012. By 2013, he became executive vice president of operations.

Olsen became Chief Executive Officer of LafargeHolcim on July 10, 2015. Olsen conducted the $44bn cross border merger and integration of Lafarge with Holcim. He was responsible for "140,000 employees and revenues of about €30bn."

The findings of an independent internal investigation by the Finance and Audit Committee of the LafargeHolcim Board into 2016 allegations relating to legacy Lafarge operations at its plant in Syria, released on 2 March 2017, found that company funds were given to third parties who then made arrangements with a number of groups, including "sanctioned parties", in order to "maintain operations and ensure safe passage of employees and supplies to and from the plant" during 2013 until the plant closed in September 2014.

On conclusion of the investigation the board said in a statement on 24 April 2017 regarding Eric Olsen: "Following an in-depth review, the Board has concluded that Eric Olsen was not responsible for, nor thought to be aware of, any wrongdoings that have been identified as part of its review."

However, Olsen announced his resignation on April 24, 2017, saying in a statement that "it will contribute to addressing strong tensions that have recently arisen around the Syria case" although "absolutely not involved in, nor even aware of, any wrongdoing".

On 4 March 2019 the French judges overseeing the LafargeHolcim Syria case also removed Olsen from their investigation into the LafargeHolcim financing of sanctioned parties, which had commenced in December 2017. Olsen welcomed the decision, saying that it restored his honour and allowed him to resume his career.

He left LafargeHolcim on 15 July 2017.

Olsen joined Aliaxis as Chief Executive Officer on October 1, 2020. On April 22, 2024, Olsen posted on his LinkedIn profile he would be stepping down due to a "strategic difference" and that Thierry Vanlancker would assume the role of interim Executive Chairman. This announcement was confirmed by a press release on the Aliaxis website which stated Vanlancker, currently Chairman of the Board, would be elevated to Executive Chairman effective May 1, 2024, to facilitate the transition through the second quarter of 2024.

== Philanthropy ==
Olsen formerly served as Chair of the American School of Paris.

== Personal life ==
He has two children. He resides in Paris, France.

Olsen became a bi-national, after gaining French citizenship in 2014. He enjoys skiing.
