= Xavier de La Chevalerie =

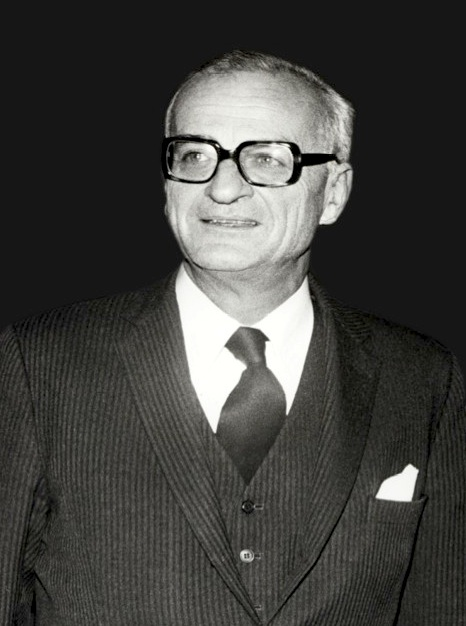
- Xavier de La Chevalerie

Chief of Staff to the President of France
- In office 1967–1969
- President: Charles de Gaulle
- Preceded by: Georges Pompidou (as Secretary-General of the Presidency)
- Succeeded by: Edouard Balladur (as Secretary-General of the Presidency)

French Ambassador to Mexico
- In office 1969–?

French Ambassador to Canada
- In office 1977–1979

French Ambassador to Japan
- In office 1979–1982

French Ambassador to the Vatican
- In office 1983–1985

Personal details
- Born: Marie-Emile Xavier Daufresne de La Chevalerie; 28 January 1920 Paris, France
- Died: 21 August 2004 (aged 84) Saint-Nazaire, France
- Spouse: Marie-France Hislaire
- Children: 7
- Education: Lycée Saint-Louis-de-Gonzague; University of Paris; École Libre des Sciences Politiques
- Occupation: Diplomat

Military service
- Allegiance: France
- Branch/service: Free French Forces
- Years of service: 1940–1945
- Battles/wars: World War II

Marie-Emile Xavier Daufresne de La Chevalerie (28 January 1920 – 21 August 2004) was a French diplomat. From 1967 to 1969 he served as chief of staff to the president of France, Charles de Gaulle.

== Biography ==
Xavier de La Chevalerie was born in Paris on 28 January 1920 to Alyette (née de Beaulaincourt-Marles) and Christian Daufresne de La Chevalerie. He studied at the Lycée Saint-Louis-de-Gonzague in Paris and then at the University of Paris in the faculties of literature and law. After further studies at the École Libre des Sciences Politiques, he began his career shortly before the outbreak of World War II. In 1940 he joined the Free French Forces and served under General Philippe Leclerc in Africa. He subsequently served as a diplomatic aide at the French embassy in the United States when it re-opened in 1944 following the liberation of France.

After the war, he served in a variety of diplomatic posts, primarily in North Africa, Asia, and the Levant. He and his cousin, Xavier de Beaulaincourt-Marles, who had served as Charles de Gaulle's private secretary since 1948, were part of de Gaulle's close entourage during the period of the so-called politics of grandeur (1960-1968). Many of them, including de La Chevalerie, later served on the administrative council of the Fondation Charles de Gaulle.

From 1961 to 1962, de La Chevalerie served as Chief of Staff to the French Minister of Foreign Affairs, and then held a similar post at the Ministère de la Coopération (Ministry of International Cooperation).

In 1967, he was named Chief of Staff to President de Gaulle and served in that post until 1969 when de Gaulle resigned from office.

Shortly after de Gaulle's resignation in 1969, de La Chevalerie was appointed ambassador to Mexico and resumed his diplomatic career. He subsequently served as France's ambassador to Gambia (1973-1977), Guinea-Bissau (1975-1977), Senegal (1975-1977), Canada (1977-1979), Japan (1979-1982), and the Vatican (1983-1985).

De La Chevalerie was married to Marie-France (née Hislaire), the daughter of the Belgian journalist and writer, René Hislaire. The couple had seven children. Xavier de La Chevalerie died on 21 August 2004 in Saint Nazaire. His wife pre-deceased him in 1985.

== Sources ==
- Andrews, William (1982). Presidential Government in Gaullist France: A Study of Executive-Legislative Relations, 1958-1974. SUNY Press. ISBN 0873956044
- Chiaradia, Éric (2011). L'entourage du général de Gaulle: juin 1958-avril 1969. Editions Publibook. ISBN 2748360168 (in French)
- Lafitte, Jacques and Taylor, Stephen (eds.) (1997). "Daufresne de La Chevalerie (Xavier, Marie-Emile)". Who's Who in France, p. 533. J. Lafitte. ISBN 2857840365 (in French)
- Ministère des affaires étrangères. (2008). Documents diplomatiques français: 1967. (Vol. 2: 1 July 29 December). Peter Lang. ISBN 9052013950 (in French)
- New York Times (23 September 1944). "French Embassy in U.S. Reopened; Tricolor Hoisted on Building Closed Since the Rupture With Vichy in 1942" (subscription required)
- New York Times (23 February 1945). "Miss Marie-France Hislaire Is Affianced To Xavier de la Chevalerie, French Aide" (subscription required)
- New York Times (24 August 1951). "Rene Hislaire, Editor for Many Years, Dies". (subscription required)

Further reading

- De La Chevalerie, Xavier (1997). "Le voyage du général de Gaulle au Québec en 1967", Espoir, No. 112 (in French)
- De La Chevalerie, Xavier (1998). "Les journées de Mai 1968 à l'Élysée et leur épilogue, Espoir, No. 115 (in French)
- Ross, André (2005). "Xavier de La Chevalerie", Espoir, No. 143, pp. 156–158 (in French)
