= Thames Materials =

Waste management company in England

Thames Materials Ltd
- Industry: Recycling
- Founded: 1995 in Brentford, United Kingdom
- Headquarters: Uxbridge, United Kingdom
- Website: www.thamesmaterials.com

Thames Materials Ltd is a waste management company based in West London, UK which specialises in the removal, transfer and recycling of waste materials. The company was formed in 1995.

== History ==
Thames Materials ltd was founded in 1995, it started as a small muck-away business with only two vehicles and based in Brentford and remained that way until 2003 before the company underwent a change of ownership and began to increase in size and profitability.

In 2002 the UK Traffic Commissioner attempted to revoke its licence to operate lorries in 2002, which was overturned on appeal. The decision was reversed on the grounds that a change in ownership had taken place. In March 1999 the company was called to a public inquiry due to unsatisfactory maintenance and convictions, and as a result the company's fleet was reduced from 10 to 7 vehicles. This license was later increased to 14 vehicles along with the successful appeal in 2002. In October 1999 the company was called to a public inquiry and had its licence suspended for 2 weeks as there were concerns of regarding the company's tachograph sheets. The company then failed to notify the UK traffic commissioner regarding a conviction a driver in 2001.

In 2004 Thames Materials moved to a larger base in Hanwell to deal with the expanding business and fleet of lorries. In 2007 the company purchased another site in Harefield to use for their own recycling processes, this has since become their main site of operations equipped with a state-of-the-art recycling facility for construction materials.

The company has been criticised for having a poor safety record. In 2009, Thames Materials allowed a new driver to work at the company despite him previously being convicted of 16 instances of driving an HGV while disqualified and a conviction of reckless driving. The driver then went on to kill a cyclist, Catriona Patel, while driving a Thames Materials HGV. The driver was over the alcohol limit and using a mobile phone at the time of the incident and was convicted of death by dangerous driving.

On 7 December 2010 a laden Thames Materials Limited lorry was involved in a fatal collision with a London taxi carrying 3 Japanese businessmen near to Chiswick House, Chiswick. One of the passengers was killed. The lorry traveled through the central reservation of the dual carriageway. The driver was arrested on suspicion of death by dangerous driving, driving while unfit and possession of a controlled substance.

In December 2025, it was announced Thames Materials had been acquired by the Zug, Switzerland-headquartered multi-national building materials and aggregates company, Holcim for an undisclosed amount.

== Notable Projects ==
Thames Materials have been involved in several of the largest construction projects in the UK in recent times including:

- The regeneration of Heathrow Terminal 3,
- The construction of Heathrow Terminal 5,
- The ongoing construction of Crossrail
- The construction of several venues for the 2012 Summer Olympics.

== See also ==
- List of waste management companies
- Waste management
