= Heracles General Cement =

Heracles General Cement Corporation
- Native name: Heracles General Cement Corporation
- Industry: Building materials
- Headquarters: Athens, Greece
- Area served: Greece
- Key people: Takis Athanasopoulos (Chairman); Dimitris Chanis (CEO)
- Revenue: €212.66 million (2017)
- Net income: €(11.94) million (2017)
- Total assets: €507.81 million (2017)
- Total equity: €272.10 million (2017)
- Owner: LafargeHolcim (100%)
- Number of employees: 511 (2018)
- Website: www.lafarge.gr

Heracles General Cement Corporation (Greek: Ανώνυμος Γενική Εταιρία Τσιμέντων Ηρακλής) (Α.Γ.Ε.Τ ΗΡΑΚΛΗΣ) is a Greece-based cement, concrete and aggregates company which operates a large number of plants and facilities throughout Greece and Switzerland.

== Structure ==
HERACLES General Cement Company S.A. is a subsidiary of LafargeHolcim. As of September 2018, it employs 511.

== Location ==
The company is headquartered in Athens, Greece.

== Facilities ==
Heracles operates three cement production plants, one of which, located in Volos, is the largest cement plant in Europe. It also operates six distribution centers around Greece.

== Products and services ==
Heracles offers steel frame and mechanical maintenance services, as well as sea transportation and ship management services. Its main products include different grades of cement, bagged or in bulk, aggregates, and concrete, for construction or for other purposes. It also sells intermediate cement production materials, such as clinker.

== Carbon capture ==
Announced in 2022, the Olympus carbon capture and storage (CCS) project aims to make its Milaki cement plant in Evia a net-zero carbon facility. The project, funded by the EU Innovation Fund with an investment of over €300 million, utilizes carbon capture and storage (CCS) technologies.

In January 2025, Heracles signed a Front-End Engineering Design (FEED) with Air Liquide to advance the Olympus carbon capture and storage (CCS) project at its Milaki plant in Greece. Air Liquide will provide integrated systems for CO_{2} capture, oxygen enrichment, and cryogenic separation. The captured CO_{2} will be liquefied and transported by sea to the offshore sequestration facility at Prinos in the Aegean Sea.
