= Lafarge (company) =

French industrial company

- Type: Division
- ISIN: FR0000120537
- Industry: Building materials
- Predecessor: Blue Circle Industries
- Founded: 1833; 193 years ago
- Founder: Joseph-Auguste Pavin de Lafarge
- Headquarters: Paris, France
- Key people: Eric Olsen (chairman and CEO)
- Products: Cement, Construction aggregates, asphalt production and concrete
- Revenue: €12.843 billion (2014)
- Operating income: €1.881 billion (2014)
- Net income: €770.36 million (2014)
- Total assets: €34.804 billion (end 2014)
- Number of employees: 63,000 (end 2014)
- Parent: Holcim Group

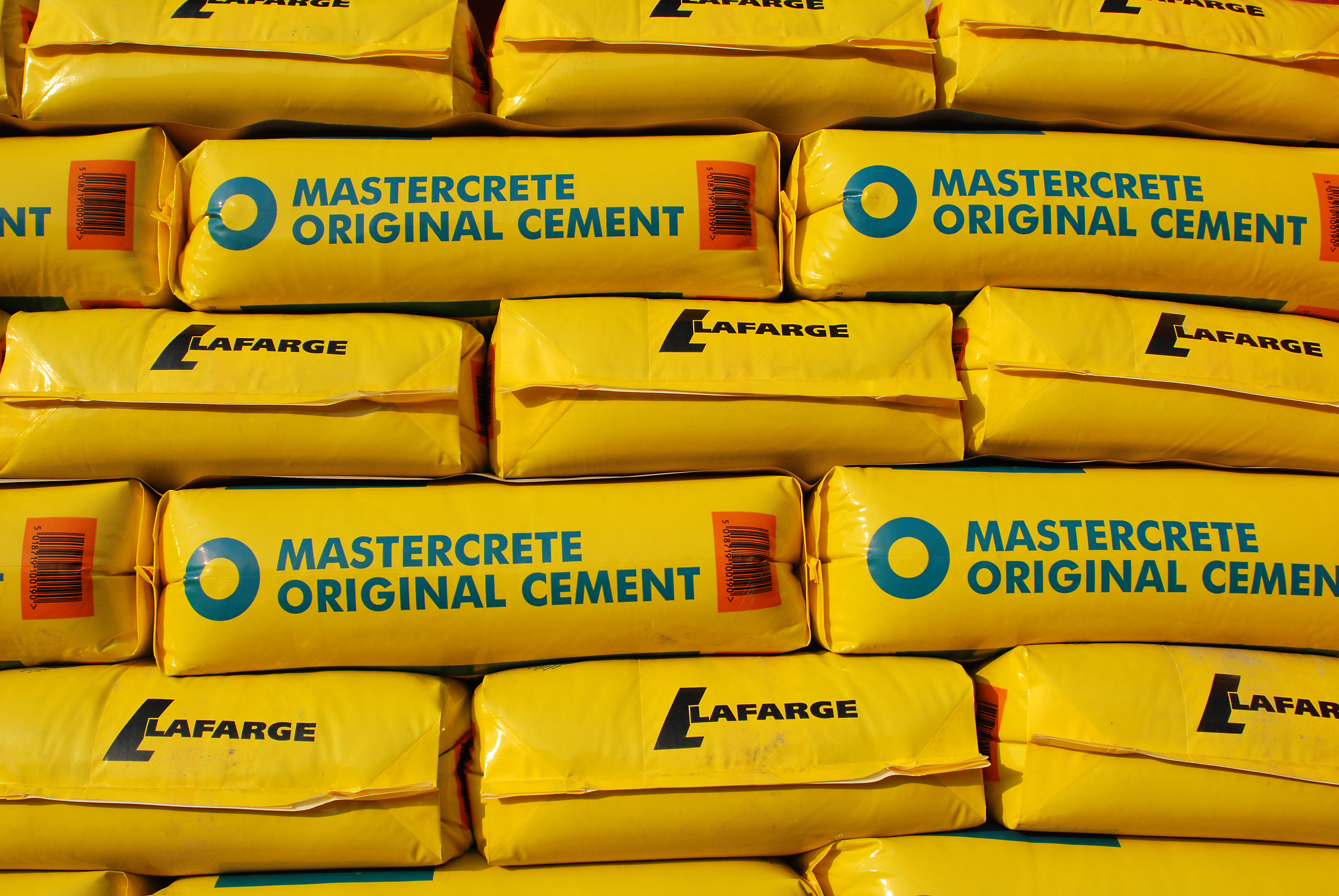
Bags of Lafarge cement with the Blue Circle logo.

Lafarge is a French industrial company specialising in cement, construction aggregates, and concrete. It is the world's largest cement manufacturer. It was founded in 1833 by Joseph-Auguste Pavin de Lafarge and is a part of the Holcim Group.

In 2015, Lafarge merged with Holcim and a new company was formed under the name of LafargeHolcim. It was renamed to Holcim Group in 2021.

In the Lafarge scandal it was convicted of financing terrorism and complicity in crimes against humanity by the United States Department of Justice for paying $5.92 million to the terrorist groups Islamic State and al-Nusra Front between 2013 and 2014 to keep its cement plant in Syria operating.

== History ==
=== Foundation and development ===
Lafarge was founded in 1833 by Joseph-Auguste Pavin de Lafarge in Le Teil, France (Ardèche), to exploit the limestone quarry in Mont Saint-Victor between Le Teil and Viviers. The limestone is white and argillaceous, and yielded an eminently hydraulic lime. In 1864 Lafarge signed its first international contract for the delivery of 110,000 tonnes of lime to the Suez Canal construction project.

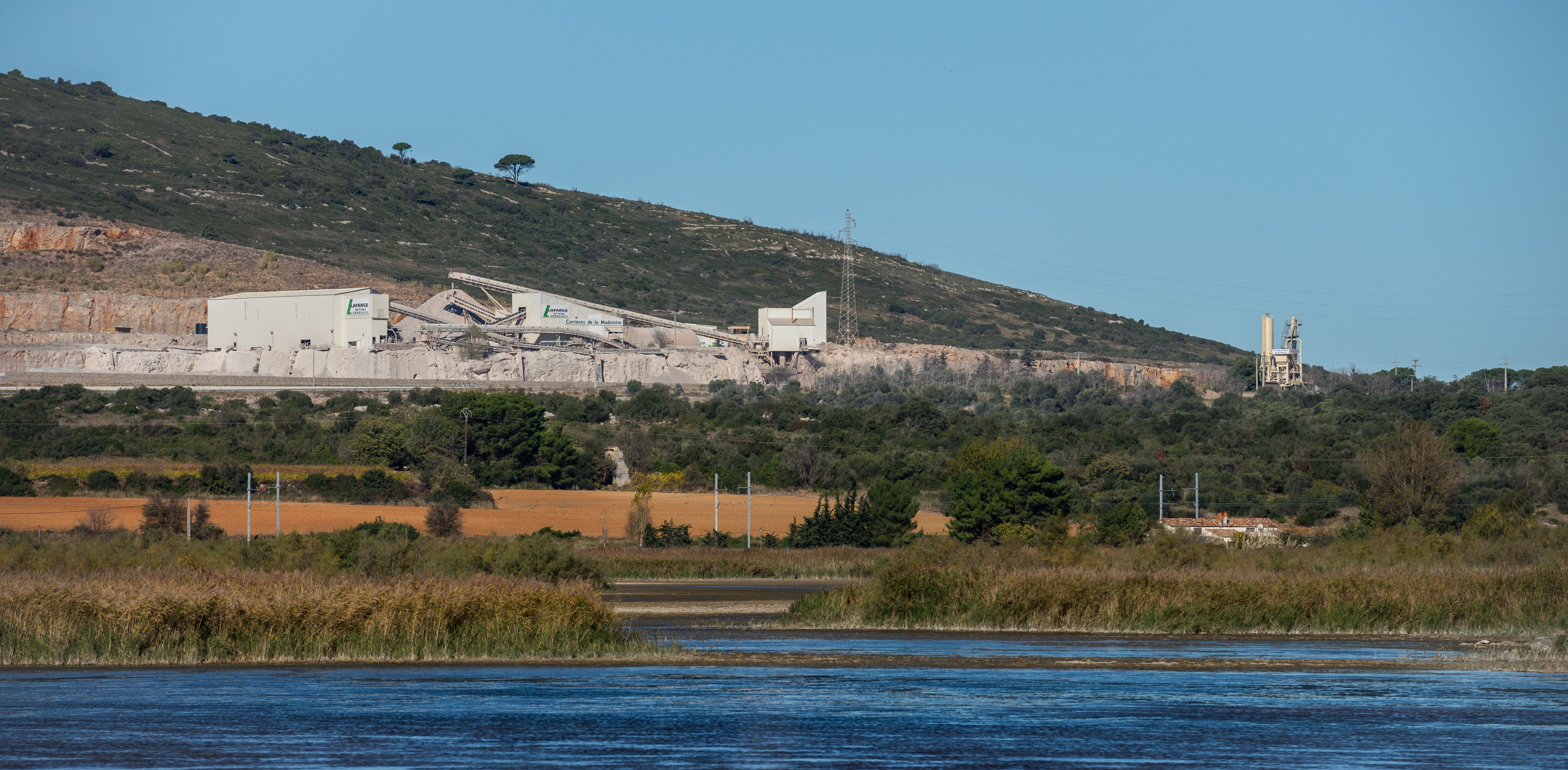
Villeneuve-lès-Maguelone

During the Second World War, Lafarge provided the Nazi regime with concrete for the French part of the Atlantic Wall. This maintained activity permitted the company to transition rapidly to the period of post-war reconstruction.

In 1980, Lafarge joined with the Belgian coal, coke and fertilizer company Coppée to become SA Lafarge Coppée.

Lafarge purchased a plant from the National Gypsum in early 1987. Ten years later, it bought Redland plc, a British quarry operator.

In 1999, Lafarge acquired a 100 percent shareholding in Hima Cement Limited, the second-largest cement manufacturer in Uganda, with an installed capacity of 850,000 metric tonnes annually, as of January 2011. That same year, Lafarge entered the Indian market through its cement business, with the acquisition of Tata Steel's cement activity. This acquisition was followed by the purchase of the Raymond Cement facility in 2001. In 2001, Lafarge, then the world's second largest cement manufacturer, acquired Blue Circle Industries (BCI), a British company which at the time was the world's sixth largest cement manufacturer, to become the world's largest cement manufacturer.

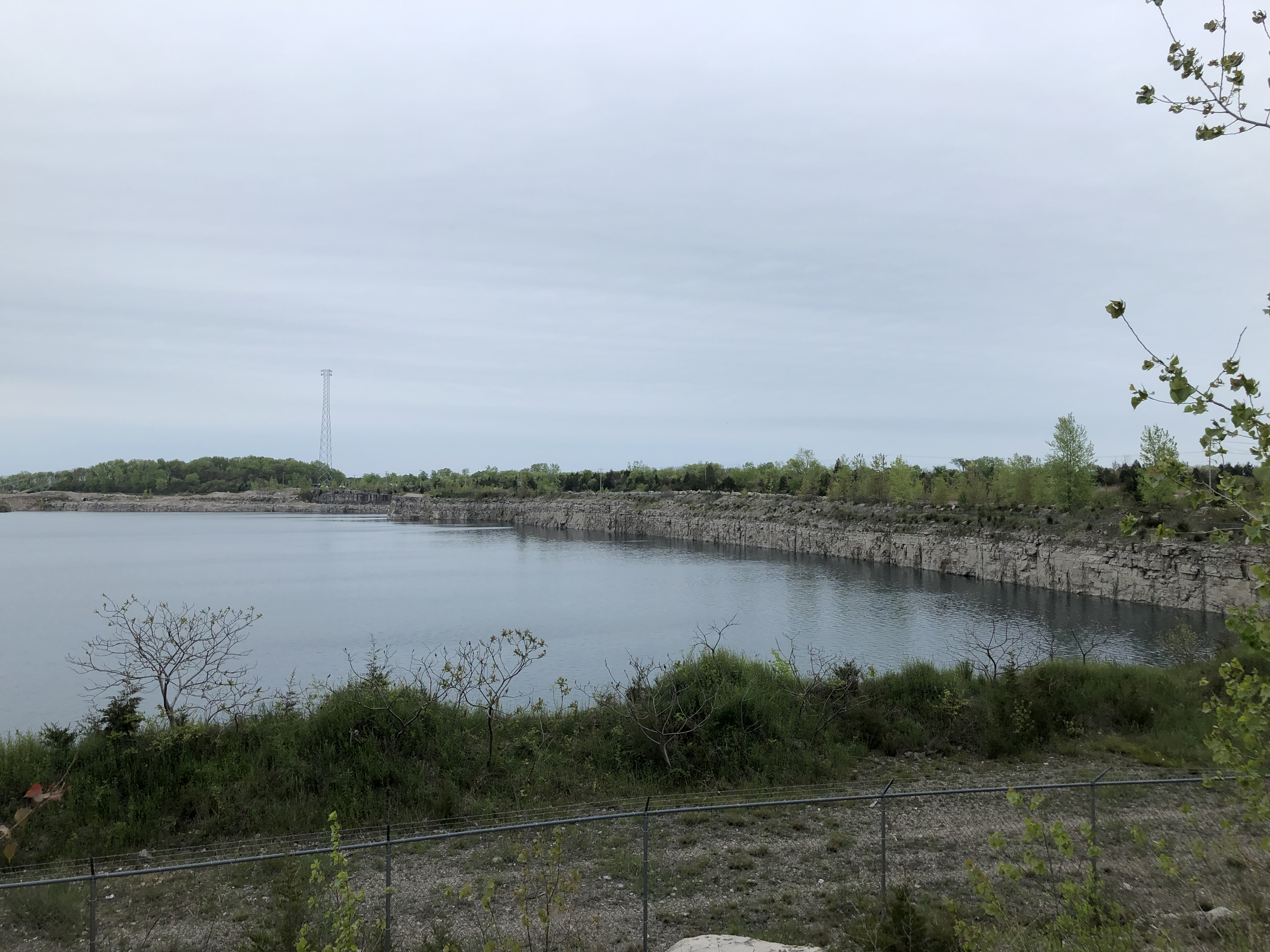
The Lafarge quarry on Kelleys Island, Ohio.

In 2006, Lafarge North America shareholders accepted a $3 billion tender offer from Lafarge Group which gave the parent company full control over the North American business, removing LNA from the New York Stock Exchange. Previously the group had owned 53 percent of LNA shares.

In 2007, the company divested its roofing division, selling it to a private equity group under a deal that resulted in Lafarge retaining a 35 percent equity stake.

In December 2007, Lafarge announced the purchase of the Orascom Cement Group, an Egyptian-based cement producer with operations across Africa and the Middle East, from Orascom Construction Industries (OCI).

On 15 May 2008, Lafarge acquired Larsen & Toubro Ready Mix-Concrete (RMC) business in India for $349 million.

In 2009, Lafarge sold the Canadian precast concrete company Pre-Con to Armtec Infrastructure Income Fund.

In 2010, Lafarge strengthened its presence in Brazil (an agreement with Lafarge and STRABAG to create a common company in Cement in Central Europe).

In 2011, Lafarge SA announced it would build a cement plant in Langkat, North Sumatra, Indonesia with an investment of up to Rp 5 trillion ($585 million).

In 2011 Lafarge sold to Boral its stake in their common Asian Gypsum joint-venture LBGA (Lafarge Boral Gypsum Asia).

Lafarge launched three plants in Hungary, Syria and Nigeria and created a joint venture with Anglo American in the United Kingdom.

During early 2015, the group sold most of its European, South American, Asian and Australian gypsum operations.

In September 2013, Lafarge agreed to the sale of its 53.3 percent stake in its Honduras subsidiary Lafarge Cementos SA de CV to Cementos Argos for €232m.

In 2018, the Lafarge Cement plant located south of Kobanî, Syria was being used as a base of operations by 1st Marine Infantry Parachute Regiment and United States Army forces.

During 2022, Lafarge Egypt launched "Shatbna," an eco-friendly masonry cement with a 40 percent lower carbon footprint.

The company is active in Greece through the full ownership of Heracles General Cement, since 1991.

In September 2024, Lafarge was in the process of building a new cement plant in Ratari near Obrenovac, within Serbia.

=== Merger with Holcim ===
On 7 April 2014, Lafarge and Holcim announced they had agreed to terms on a "merger of equals". The exchange ratio will be based on 9 Holcim shares for 10 Lafarge shares. The new company would be based in Switzerland and have a manufacturing capacity of 427 million tons a year would vastly exceed the 227 million ton capacity Anhui Conch. Lafarge CEO Bruno Lafont and Holcim Chairman Wolfgang Reitzle became co-chairmen of the new group. Eric Olsen, then Lafarge's Executive Vice-president in charge of Operations, became the CEO of the new group. Executives from both companies said the deal would save the new company 1.4 billion euros (US$1.9 billion) annually and create "the most advanced group in the building materials industry."

The deal faced significant regulatory obstacles, as 15 different jurisdictions could have potentially raised objections. The cement market in Europe is tightly consolidated and antitrust scrutiny of deals has been commonplace since the 1970s. To meet regulatory concerns, Holcim and Lafarge planned to sell or spinoff assets that generated about 5 billion euros (US$6.9 billion) of revenue in 2013 in areas of large overlap between the two companies. Lafont said the merger was aimed at rebalancing operations, not cutting costs. He said overlapping businesses would be sold, not closed, so industry job losses would be minimal.

Industry analysts said the deal would combine Holcim's marketing strength with Lafarge's edge in innovation, while providing significant cost savings, but cautioned "the road to merger clearance will be a long, complex and uncertain one." Others said the deal could lead to further mergers within the industry and give competitors a chance to pick up assets at a bargain price. Most analysts surveyed by Reuters felt the merger would be approved in the end.

The acquisition would turn it into the world's third-biggest building materials supplier. Analysts said that although it was broadly anticipated by the market. "The additional assets expand the company’s footprint in Eastern Europe and into Brazil and the Philippines. Given the well flagged nature of the deal, however, these benefits are largely reflected in the price at current levels," Alan Breen of Cantor Fitzgerald Ireland said.

On 10 July 2015, Lafarge merged with Holcim. On 15 July 2015, the new company was officially launched around the globe under the name of LafargeHolcim, which was later renamed as the Holcim Group on 8 July 2021.

== Legal and environmental issues ==
=== Terrorist financing and complicity in crimes against humanity charges ===
In June 2016, France opened an inquiry into the activities of Lafarge in Syria. The inquiry followed reports by French journalist Dorothée Myriam Kellou, published by Le Monde and France 24, which uncovered deals Lafarge made with an array of armed groups, including the Islamic State of Iraq and the Levant terrorist group, in order to keep its cement plant in Syria operating. ISIL captured the plant on 19 September 2014. In 2017, LafargeHolcim executives were investigated for these claims in the civil and criminal courts.

Lafarge sought to have the claims dismissed, arguing that the payments were intended to allow Lafarge to continue commercial activities, not to support ISIS, and that the company and its executives could not be held accountable for actions undertaken by its Syrian subsidiary. Initially, the Paris Court of Appeals agreed with Lafarge.

On 7 September 2021, the French Supreme Court confirmed charges of financing terrorism and endangering employees' lives. The Supreme Court (Cour de cassation) quashed the Court of Appeal ruling, determining that there was sufficient evidence, including minutes from Lafarge meetings, for the investigative judge to find Lafarge had "precise knowledge" of the nature of ISIS's activities. In the decision, the Supreme Court explained that "crimes against humanity are the most serious of crimes because beyond the attack on the individual, which it transcends, it targets and denies humanity." It found that for a conviction on complicity in crimes against humanity, Lafarge did not need to be a part of ISIS but "It is sufficient that [the accused] has knowledge that the main perpetrators are committing or are about to commit such a crime against humanity and that by his aid or assistance, he facilitates the preparation or the commission thereof." The Court concluded that "the knowing payment of a sum of several million dollars to an organization whose object is only criminal is sufficient to characterize complicity by aiding and abetting." The Supreme Court referred the matter back to the Court of Appeal.

On 18 May 2022, the Investigative Chamber of the Paris Court of Appeals rejected a request by Lafarge to dismiss charges of complicity in crimes against humanity and endangering lives. In confirming the charges, the Court of Appeal judges found that "although informed that the actions of ISIS could constitute crimes against humanity, Lafarge, which could have put an end to the activities of LCS by asking it to close the plant, decided instead to continue this activity … even if it meant paying several million dollars to its groups".

In a statement, the company said it strongly disagreed with the Court of Appeal's decision to retain complicity in crimes against humanity within the scope of an investigation and said it would appeal the decision to France's Supreme Court.

On 17 October 2022, the United States Department of Justice reached a $777.8 million criminal plea agreement with Lafarge in the case. Executives with Lafarge agreed to the deal after paying $5.92 million to Islamic State and al-Nusra Front leaders and urging them to help the company keep its production facilities running, according to a company spokesman and law enforcement official.

On 13 April 2026, French court found Lafarge guilty of financing terrorist groups in Syria, by paying millions of euros to organizations like ISIS and al-Nusra between 2013–2014. The court also convicted several former executives involved in the scheme.

=== Environmental issues ===
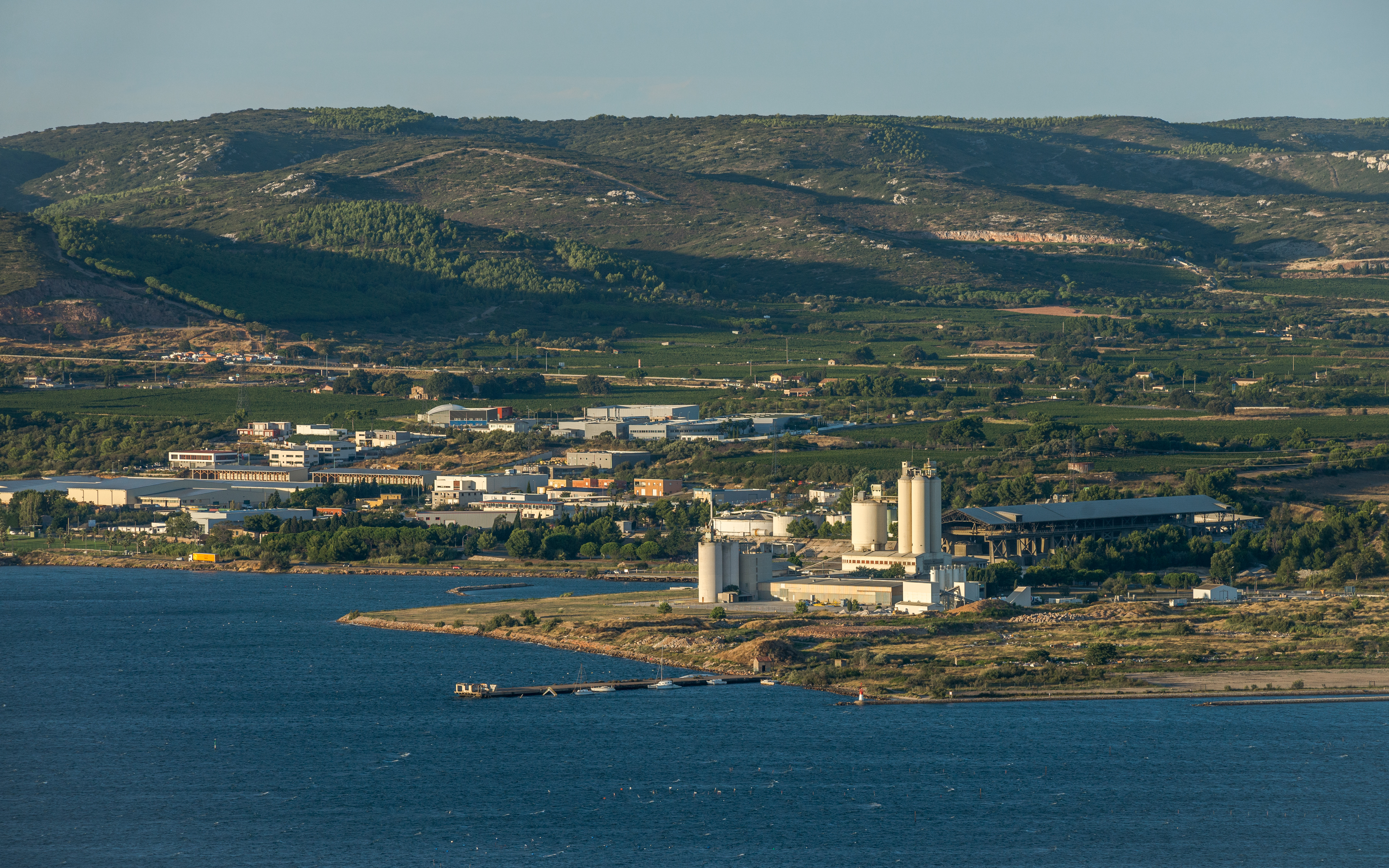
Cement plant in Frontignan, France.

==== Mercury emissions in New York ====
On 11 July 2008, the Albany Times Union reported that Lafarge's Ravena, New York plant "was the greatest source of mercury emissions in New York from 2004 to 2006" According to the story, plans had been made to upgrade the plant to reduce the mercury emissions. A second story published the following day, stated that the factory had emitted 400 pounds (181 kg) of mercury annually from 2004 to 2006.

In November 2010, Lafarge opposed new Environmental Protection Agency regulations in the United States that required mercury-emissions reductions at cement plants. Preliminary data published by the EPA for the year 2009 showed 145 pounds of mercury were recorded for the Ravena plant (total on- and off-site disposals). The plant has continued to perform within permitted limits.

In July 2013, the New York State Department of Health, in partnership with the federal Agency for Toxic Substances and Disease Registry, completed a public health assessment for communities near the Lafarge Cement Plant in Ravena, New York. Major findings and results from the NYS DOH Lafarge Cement Plant Health Assessment included:

- Breathing the ground-level air concentrations of metals (e.g., mercury), polycyclic aromatic hydrocarbons, polychlorinated biphenyls, carbon monoxide, lead, particulate matter, dioxins, furans, hydrocarbons, volatile organic compounds and ammonia released in cement kiln stack emissions is not expected to harm people's health.
- For the general public, breathing ground-level air concentrations of sulfur dioxide or nitrogen dioxide released in the kiln stack emissions is not expected to harm people's health.
- Touching, breathing or accidentally eating dust that originated from the Ravena cement plant and other sources is not expected to harm the health of people who reside, work, or attend school in the community.
- Current health status of the communities near the cement plant is similar to the health status of other areas in the region and state.

On 23 July 2013, under an agreement with the U.S. Environmental Protection Agency, the U.S. Department of Justice and the state of New York, Lafarge North America Inc. agreed to fund $1.5 million in projects to reduce air pollution in the community surrounding its Ravena, New York cement plant. The agreement also amends a March 2010 consent decree that the federal Environmental Protection Agency, New York and 11 other states entered into with Lafarge requiring the company to limit pollutant emissions from its 13 plants nationwide.

Under the agreement, Lafarge North America would adhere to an updated schedule that provides Lafarge an additional 18 months to finish construction of a new modernized facility by 1 July 2016. At that time, the existing Ravena plant would be taken offline.

Lafarge's $300 million upgrade to its Ravena plant included a new, German-designed dry-process cement kiln to replace two 50-year-old wet-process kilns. The new kiln was to use less coal and emit fewer pollutants, including a 66% reduction in mercury emissions, while increasing production capacity. It will also take less water from the Hudson River, getting most of its water from the nearby limestone quarry that feeds the plant.

Details of the agreement include that Lafarge North America will:

- Invest $1.5 million in projects benefiting the local environment;
- Make additional improvements to the environmental infrastructure at the existing Ravena plant;
- Adopt new, stricter emission limits for SO2 and mercury; and
- Set a strict, new timetable to complete the Ravena plant modernization project.

==== Canadian watersheds ====
In July 2019, the company filed a request for a permit with the Ontario Ministry of the Environment, Conservation and Parks to increase the amount of water it moves from its gravel pits near Guelph in Wellington County, Ontario, Canada into the local watershed. According to a news report, "If it’s approved, the company would be permitted to take up to 27.7 million litres of water a day — more than half of the city’s average daily demand of 47 million litres" but a City of Guelph report stated that it would "add a groundwater water-taking of 21,718 m3/day to the existing permit". The company was already permitted to take just over six million litres per day. According to a Lafarge spokesperson, the company's plan was actually to move the water from the quarry and pump into nearby wetlands or the Speed River, not to take water from the area. The Wellington Water Watchers advocacy group expressed concern about how the discharged water might affect aquatic ecosystems downstream and believed that a full environmental review was necessary before the request for the permit should be allowed. "With climate change, there's all kinds of uncertainties that come into our long-term water security issues and we can no longer afford to play fast and loose with that", said the group's chair Robert Case.

== Board of directors ==
The board of directors of Lafarge has 15 members appointed by the annual shareholders' meeting for a period of four years:

- Chairman of the board of directors and chief executive officer: Bruno Lafont
- Vice-chairman of the Board of Directors: Oscar Fanjul
- Directors: Philippe Charrier, Juan Gallardo, Ian Gallienne, Mina Gerowin, ³, Luc Jeanneney, Gérard Lamarche, Hélène Ploix, Baudouin Prot, Christine Ramon, Michel Rollier, Ewald Simandl, Véronique Weill.
- Honorary Chairmen: Bertrand P. Collomb and Bruno Lafont

Former members of the Board include Alain Joly, Michel Pébereau, Gérald Frère, Michel Bon, Philippe Dauman, Nassef Sawiris, Hillary Clinton.

== Financial data ==
The following is a summary of data:

Financial data in millions of euro
Year	2001	2002	2003	2004	2005	2006	2007	2008	2009	2010	2011	2012	2013	2014
Sales	13,698	14,610	13,658	14,436	15,969	16,909	17,614	19,033	15,884	14,834	15,284	15,816	15,198	12,843
EBITDA	2,862	3,101	2,820	3,028	2,920	3,610	4,183	4,618	3,600	3,614	3,217	3,450	3,102	2,721
Net results	750	446	728	868	1,096	1,372	1,909	1,598	736	827	593	432	601	143
Net debt	9,332	8,544	6,734	7,017	7,221	9,845	8,685	16,884	13,795	13,993	11,974	11,317	10,330	9,310
Staff	82,892	77,547	75,733	77,075	80,146	82,734	77,720	83,440	77,994	75,680	68,000	65,000	64,000	63,000

By 29 February 2016 the company had a share value of 17.292 billion euros, distributed in 288,383,057 shares.

== Nature reserves ==
Lafarge owns several nature reserves. An example of this is Brandon Marsh, in the UK, which is on an old quarry and an existing quarry is next door to it. Another example is the LaCouronne plant in France. It was never quarried but Lafarge bought some land and began to convert it into a 16.5-hectare (41-acre) nature reserve. Other nature reserves are Eardington Nature Reserve; Shropshire (UK), Medway Nature Reserve; Kent (UK) and NWT Besthorpe Nature Reserve; Trent Vale (UK).
