= Édouard Tétreau =

French financial analyst (born 1970)

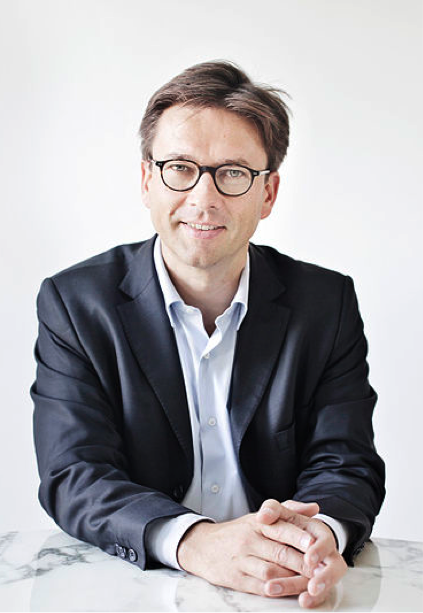
- Born: 8 May 1970 (age 56); Soissons, France
- Education: HEC Paris
- Occupations: Writer, political and economic consultant
- Employer: Edelman

Édouard Tétreau (born 8 May 1970) is a French public intellectual known as an essayist, columnist, and political and economic consultant. He founded his advisory firm Mediafin in 2004, which he brought to Edelman in December 2022, to run their Global Families advisory services.

== Education and career ==
Tétreau was born in Soissons, France, and attended the Jesuit school Lycée Saint-Louis-de-Gonzague in Paris. He graduated from HEC Paris in 1992 with a degree in entrepreneurship. He has worked for international organizations such as the European Council on Foreign Relations, AXA Private Equity in New York City, and Schroders in London.

In 2004, he founded Mediafin, a strategic consulting firm through which he advised a number of European industrial families, financial institutions and CEOs of European Fortune 500 companies.

A weekly columnist for French newspapers Le Figaro et Les Échos, he writes on matters concerning politics, digital challenges, and finance, from a pro-European perspective. He is a regular television commentator and radio contributor on macroeconomic and policy issues.

Tétreau served as a trustee of the Committee for Economic Development (CED), a public policy organization based in Washington, D.C. He is also a member of the advisory board of La Maison Française at Columbia University and an affiliate professor at HEC Paris, where he taught a course titled "Managing in times of financial crises."

In the early days of 2016, he helped launch Emmanuel Macron's presidential bid, both in terms of network and fund-raising. While continuing his advisory work for European CEOs and family offices, he informally advised the French presidency, on a number of issues ranging from the relationships with the French Catholic Church and the Vatican, to the post-covid strategy (“plan de relance”).

In September 2021, he launched a non-profit association, Les Ponts Neufs, which groups together every two months 200 French artists, CEOs, civil servants, military officers, diplomats, and people “on the frontlines”: farmers, trade unionists, heads of NGOs, charities, etc.

In December 2022, he sold his consultancy Mediafin to Edelman, as Vice Président for France and Chairman of the Global Families Practice.

== Writing ==
Tétreau has frequently called for the creation of the "United States of Europe" in his articles in Le Monde and Le Figaro and Les Échos, and in his public interventions with the French Parliament, in China, and in New York City.

In his book Analyste, published in 2005, Tétreau discusses the excesses and short-termism of the financial system during the internet bubble. Tétreau then published his second book 20 000 milliards de dollars upon his return to France in the fall of 2010, after having spent three years in[New York City. The book discusses the national debt of the United States following the 2008 subprime mortgage crisis and the country's transition from the Bush to the Obama administration. It was later translated to Chinese and published by China Citic Press.

Tétreau is also the author of Quand le dollar nous tue, published by Grasset in 2011.

His book, Au-delà du mur de l’argent, was published on 9 September 2015 by French publisher Stock. It follows an Autumn 2014 briefing paper for the Vatican's Pontifical Council for Culture, calling for an intervention of Pope Francis in New York in September 2015, during the Pope's scheduled visit to the U.S. The book warns of the risks of a major and imminent "accident" in the global economy. It offers concrete answers for an alternative economic model based upon "Pope Francis economics" and various teachings from other religions, which, like many secular philosophies, give priority to the poorest and most fragile elements of our societies.

His last essay, Les Etats Généraux, was published with Les Editions de l’Observatoire in 2020. Tétreau calls for a gathering of a 21st-century version of an Estates General, as he considers that the fabric of France's social contract has been torn apart and needs to be reinvented. Upon his reelection in 2022, President Macron used the expression and the symbol of the project, with hisplea for a Conseil National de la Refondation, but not its substance.

Since President Macron's 2017 election, Tétreau has written more than 100 op-eds in France's major newspapers Les Echos and Le Figaro, but not Le Monde, as he had served on its board for three years (2018–2021).

Since the start of Russia's invasion of Ukraine, he has been strongly advocating a full alignment of the traditional allied powers (France, Great Britain, the United States) against a potential “axis” between Iran, Russia and China notably. He notably called for a new “Charter of the Atlantic”.

== Recognition ==
On 16 March 2000, as a financial analyst for Crédit Lyonnais, Tétreau published an analysis of an imminent internet crash titled "Take your e-profits before a potential e-crash." In Mercury Rising, he predicted the danger of bankruptcy for Vivendi Universal, leading to the departure of Vivendi head Jean-Marie Messier.

In 2005, Tétreau received the Sénat Reader Prize for an Economics Book for his book Analyste: au cœur de la folie financière.

On 10 May 2006, Tétreau spoke before the French Senate’s Commission on Finances, underlining the need for the French economy and society to prepare itself for an inevitable, brutal end to the period of financial excess and overabundance.

In China, where Tétreau's 20 000 Milliards de Dollars book was published in 2012, he became a 2013 Young Leader of the France China Foundation Programme.

== Personal life ==
Tétreau is married with three children, and resides in Paris.

== Bibliography ==
- Analyste: Au coeur de la folie financière ISBN 978-2246676614
- 20000 milliards de dollars ASIN B005SI74FS
- Excellence Ruralités: Des écoles pour la France périphérique ISBN 978-2365262750
- Au-delà du mur de l'argent ASIN B014FCACAG
- Oltre il muro del denaro ASIN B075WT766J
- Les états généraux en 2022 ASIN B08CJNW1DV
