= Xella =

German building and insulation materials company

Xella International GmbH
- Type: GmbH
- Industry: Building materials Insulation materials
- Founded: 2002; 24 years ago
- Headquarters: Duisburg, Germany
- Key people: Christophe Clemente (CEO of the Xella Group)
- Products: Building materials, insulation materials
- Revenue: 985.4 million Euro (2024)
- Number of employees: >4,351 (2024)

The Xella Group with headquarters in Duisburg, Germany, develops, manufactures and markets building and insulation materials.

In October 2025, Holcim Group agreed to acquire Xella for €1.85 billion.

== Company ==
The Xella Group develops, produces, and sells building materials and insulating materials – based on mineral resources. With its Ytong, Silka and Hebel brands, Xella is one of the world's largest manufacturers of autoclaved aerated concrete and calcium silicate blocks. The Multipor brand stands for non-combustible mineral insulation boards.

In addition to the building- and insulation materials brands, Xella provides a digital service for simplifying construction processes with blue.sprint. With the help of a digital twin, a building object can be created in virtual form in order to plan materials more efficiently and thus conserve resources. This involves working together in open BIM on the basis of a model based on an IFC standard. In past projects, up to 20 percent of the shell construction costs and 30 percent of the rough construction time could be saved by using this service.

An integral component of Xella's corporate strategy is sustainability in the sense of offering a groundwork for sustainable and healthy living, building, and renovating. Currently the company is present in more than 20 countries with 56 plants. In 2024, the Xella Group generated sales of 985,4 million euros with approximately 4,351 employees.

The Luxembourg-based holding company Xella International Holdings is owned by financial investor Lone Star, which acquired a majority stake in the Xella Group in 2017 from two private equity firms, PAI Partners of France, and Goldman Sachs of the United States, which had acquired the Xella Group from Haniel in September 2008.

== History ==
Xella originated as a change of name from Haniel Bau-Industrie, which had already existed since the 1940s and produced sand-lime bricks from 1948. Still under the name Haniel Bau-Industrie, the company acquired the Goslar Fels, Hebel and Ytong plants between 2000 and 2002. In 2002, the company took its first steps in China and changed its name to Xella Baustoffe. In 2003, the company presented itself under a new name at the BAU trade fair in Munich. In the same year, the company divested its stake in Norddeutsche Naturstein GmbH (NNG) in Flechtingen, which had been a subsidiary of Basalt-Actien-Gesellschaft since 2005.

Xella then closed numerous autoclaved aerated concrete plants, exclusively former Hebel plants. Several hundred jobs were lost.

Since 2003, Xella has maintained its own research and development company in Brandenburg with two sites — one in Emstal near Lehnin, the other in Brück near Bad Belzig. Here, technicians work in the three specialist areas of application research/building physics, process engineering, and product and process research. In 2006, the Halfen company (fastening technology) based in Langenfeld was sold. In 2007 and 2008, further international expansion took place in Eastern Europe as well as in China and Russia.

In 2008, Xella was sold by Haniel to PAI partners and Goldman Sachs Capital Partners. In 2009 and 2010, Xella opened new Ytong plants in Romania and China and a lime plant in Russia. In April 2011, Xella moved into its new corporate headquarters in Duisburg-Huckingen. On May 11, 2012, the Xella headquarters building was christened Axel Eriksson House. Axel Eriksson, Swedish architect and researcher, had invented aerated concrete in 1923.

In March 2012, the takeover of the majority of shares in the Danish H+H International A/S, based in Copenhagen, failed. The German Federal Cartel Office prohibited the takeover because it was expected to create a dominant position for Xella in the market for aerated concrete and lightweight concrete blocks in the North German and West German regional markets.The company was not able to acquire a majority stake in H+H International. A possible IPO was canceled in October 2015, citing the unfavorable market situation. In December 2016, it was announced that Xella had been sold to the investment company Lone Star for an undisclosed sum. In August 2017, Xella announced the acquisition of the Spanish insulation manufacturer Ursa, which was sold to Etex in early 2022.

== Brands ==
The Xella Group combines the competencies and know-how of its product brands Ytong, Silka, Multipor, Hebel and continuously develops them further. Xella is one of the few European companies in the building materials industry to operate its own technology and research center with three departments: product and process research, quality management and application research/building physics.

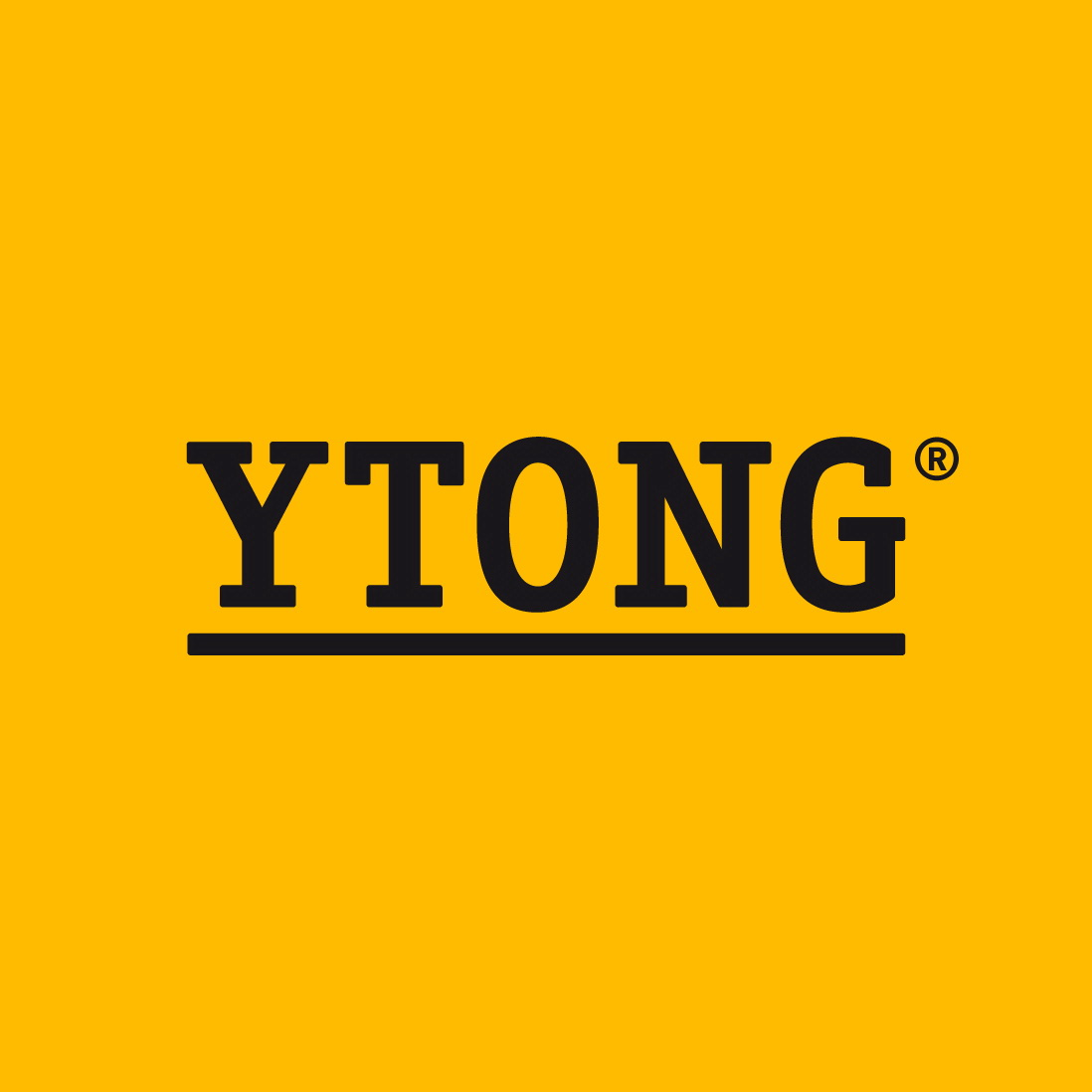
Ytong-Logo

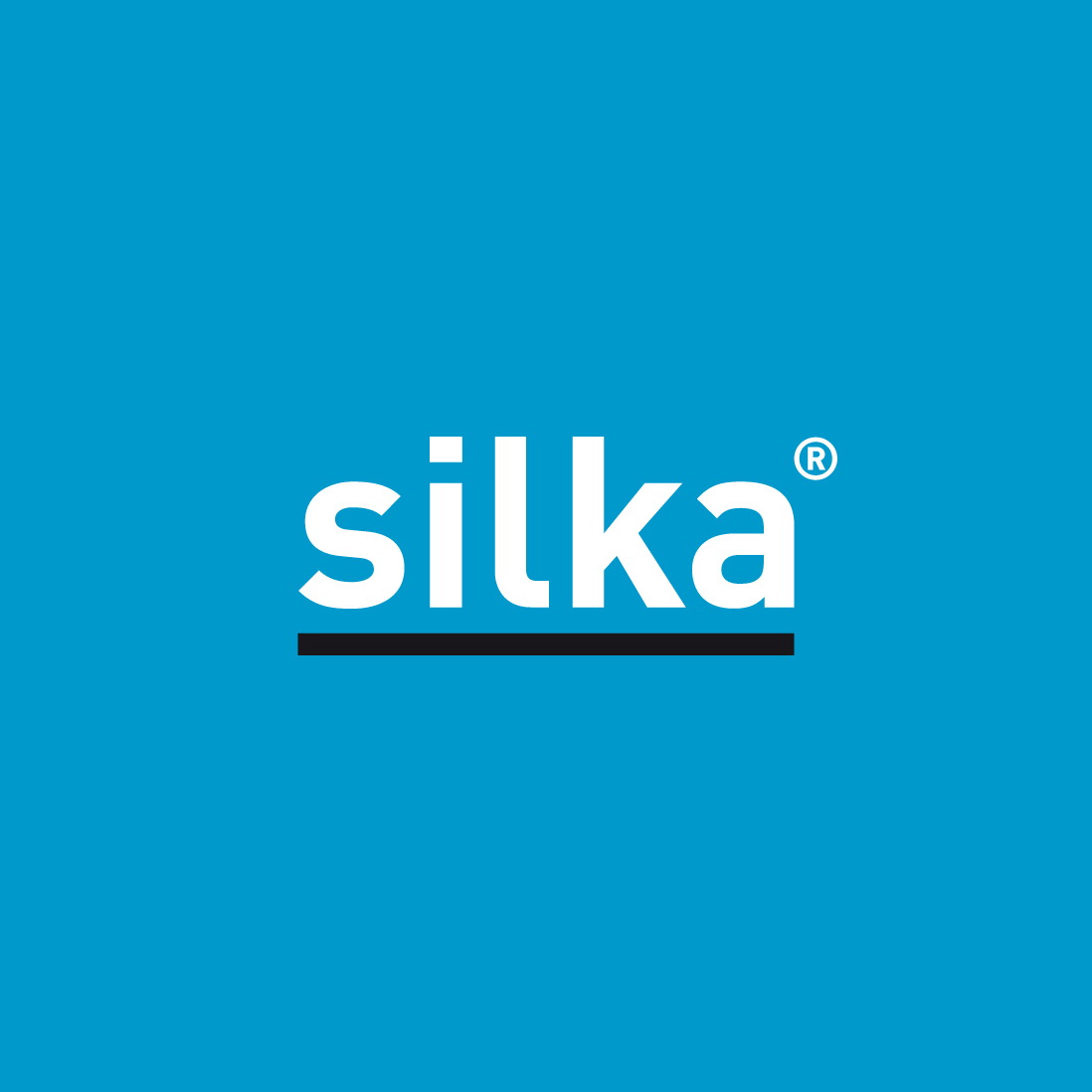
Silka-Logo

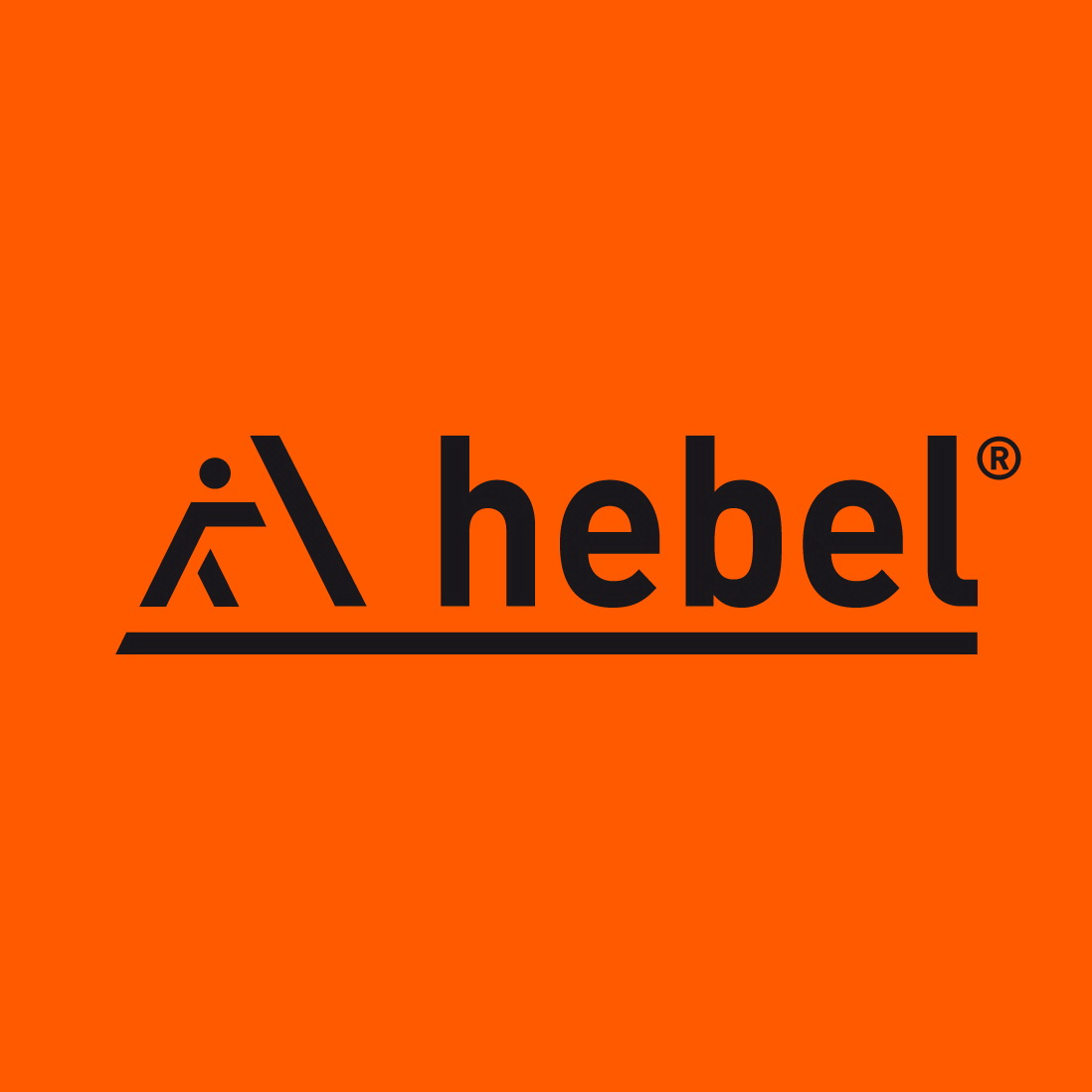
Hebel-Logo

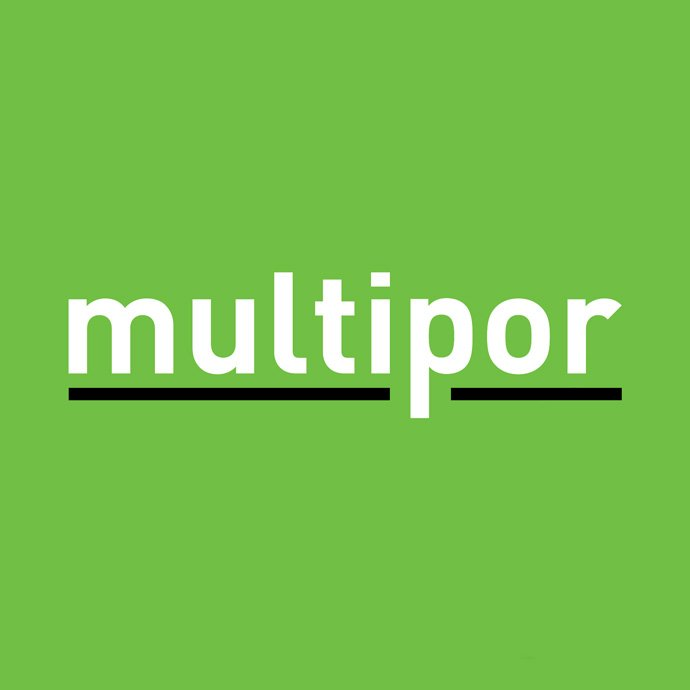
Multipor-Logo
