= Saburtalo =

Saburtalo might refer to:

- Saburtalo Pantheon, burial site in Tbilisi, Georgia
- Saburtalo Line, metro line in Tbilisi, Georgia
- FC Saburtalo Tbilisi, football club in Tbilisi, Georgia
- Saburtalo District, district in Tbilisi, Georgia
