= European Union Chamber of Commerce in China =

Advocacy organization of EU companies in China

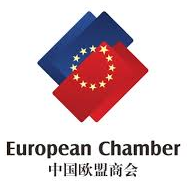
- Established: 19 October 2000
- Founder: European Union companies in China
- Type: non-profit organisation, chamber of commerce
- Legal status: Active
- Purpose: Advocacy
- Headquarters: Beijing, China
- Fields: Business advocacy, public affairs, government affairs, surveys, reports, publications, newsletters, conference and events organising, training, networking
- Members: More than 1,700 (2023)
- Official languages: English, Chinese
- Secretary General: Adam Dunnett
- President: Jens Eskelund
- Key people: Jens Eskelund (President), Stefan Bernhart (Vice-president), Fabian Blake (Vice-president), Carlo D'Andrea (Vice-president), Gianni Di Giovanni (Vice-president), Raquel Ramirez Alexander (Vice-president), Kitty Xueying Xia (Vice-president), Massimo Bagnasco (States' Representative), Simon Lichtenberg (States' Representative), Bruno Weill (States' Representative), Su Gao (Treasurer), Adam Dunnett (Secretary General).
- Affiliations: Beijing, Nanjing, South China, Shanghai, Shenyang, Southwest China, Tianjin Chapters
- Website: www.europeanchamber.com.cn

The European Union Chamber of Commerce in China (European Chamber), is a non-profit and non-governmental organisation established to support and represent the interests of companies from the European Union operating in China. The main objective of the European Chamber is to advocate for a better business environment. It does this through its membership services of advocacy, business intelligence, and community. The organisation is headquartered in Beijing, China.

== Organization ==
The European Chamber has more than 1,700 members from seven chapters active in nine Chinese cities including Beijing, Nanjing, South China (Guangzhou and Shenzhen), Shanghai, Shenyang, Southwest China (Chengdu and Chongqing), and Tianjin. The European Chamber is recognized by the Ministry of Commerce of the People's Republic of China and the China Council for the Promotion of International Trade (CCPIT), and is registered with the Ministry of Civil Affairs (MCA).

=== Executive committee ===
The executive committee of the European Chamber consists of a president, six vice presidents, a treasurer, three member states' representatives, and the European Chamber's Secretary General. Representatives of member companies are elected for a two-year term, renewable once.

=== Supervisory Board ===
The supervisory board of the European Chamber consists of member representatives who elect three persons to represent the group on the executive committee. In addition to creating an electoral college, the supervisory board meets regularly to monitor and guide the work of the executive committee. The national representatives are nominated by national chambers of commerce or embassies by default.

=== Secretariat ===
The secretariat of the European Chamber is responsible for the daily operations and activities.

== Publications ==
As a common platform for information and cooperation, the European Chamber publishes magazines and reports about the current experience of European businesses in China. These publications provide insights into current markets, key regulatory issues, industry-expert opinions, and notable social trends in China.

- European Business in China Position Paper.
- European Business in China Business Confidence Survey.
- EURObiz—Journal of the European Union Chamber of Commerce in China.
- Flash Survey on the US-China Trade War
- Made in China 2025: The Cost of Technological Leadership
- Siloing and Diversification: One World, Two Systems
- Riskful Thinking: Navigating the Politics of Economic Security
- Flash Survey on Impact of China's Data Regulations
- China's Innovation Ecosystem: the localisation dilemma
- Women in Business Report 2022
- China's Innovation Ecosystem: Right for Many, But Not for All
- Carbon Neutrality: The Role of European Companies in China's Race to 2060
- Flash Survey on COVID-19 and the War in Ukraine: Impact of European Business in China
- The Shape of Things to Come: The Race to Control Technical Standardisation
- Decoupling: Severed Ties and Patchwork Globalisation.
- In for the Long Haul: Developing A Sustainable Operating Environment for Airlines in China.
- The Road Less Travelled: European Involvement in China's Belt and Road Initiative.
- The Digital Hand: How China’s Corporate Social Credit System Conditions Market Actors.
- 18 Months Since Davos: How China's Vision Became a Reform Imperative.
- China Manufacturing 2025.
- Overcapacity in China: An Impediment to the Party’s Reform Agenda.
- Chinese Outbound Investment in the European Union.
- Dulling the Cutting Edge: How Patent-Related Policies and Practices Hamper Innovation.
- The Social and Economic Impact of Private Equity in China.
- Public procurement in China.
- Asia-Pacific Headquarters Study.

== History ==
The European Chamber was founded on 19 October 2000, by 51 European companies in search of a common representative of their interests in China. The Chamber is also part of an expanding network of European Business Organisation Worldwide Network (EBOWWN). This network promotes interactions between members and host countries and establish closer relationships with the Commission. The original purpose of the Chamber was to monitor how China implemented its WTO commitments. According to the Chamber: "Foreign firms have long complained of an uneven playing field and an opaque regulatory environment when it comes to China."

== Mission ==
The European Chamber is an organization that aims for better market access and improved operating conditions for the European Union companies operating in China. To this end, it reaches out to Chinese and European government authorities, think tanks, academics, international bodies, other chambers of commerce, and trade associations. The Chamber ensures awareness and compliance with relevant local laws, policies, and regulations. It also facilitates networking between its members, embassies, and Chinese interest groups. They oversee a network of companies and professionals, and help them exchange views and experiences regarding doing business in China. The European Chamber is primarily an advocacy organization that revolves around working groups and fora. These groups serve as a platform for the Chamber community and other local organizations, to foster understanding, share information, pursue common interests, promote trade and investment, and strengthen cooperation.
