= Holcim =

Swiss building materials and aggregates company, division of the Holcim Group

- Type: Division
- Industry: Building materials
- Founded: 1912; 114 years ago
- Headquarters: Zug, Switzerland
- Key people: Miljan Gutovic (CEO); Kim Fausing (chairman)
- Products: Cement, construction aggregate, concrete
- Revenue: CHF 16.3 billion (2024)
- Operating income: CHF 4.577 billion (2023)
- Net income: CHF 3.176 billion (2023)
- Total assets: CHF 52.69 billion (end 2023)
- Total equity: CHF 26.78 billion (end 2023)
- Number of employees: 63,448 (2023)
- Parent: Holcim Group

Holcim is a Swiss-based global building materials and aggregates flagship division of the Holcim Group. The original company was merged on 10 July 2015 with Lafarge to form LafargeHolcim as the new company and renamed to Holcim Group in 2021. The Holcim brand remained active within the group when the merger was completed.

Founded in 1912, the company expanded into France and Europe and the Middle East during the 1920s. They expanded in the Americas during the 1950s and went public in 1958. The company continued to expand in Latin America and added Asian divisions during the 1970s and 1980s. A series of mergers and buyouts made Holcim one of the two largest cement manufacturers worldwide by 2014, roughly tied with rival Lafarge. In April 2014, the two companies agreed to a US$60 billion "merger of equals". The company was the market leader in cement production in Australia, Azerbaijan, India, Slovakia, Switzerland, and Latin America.

== Overview ==
Holcim is headquartered in Zug, Switzerland, and operates in 45 countries worldwide. They employ over 48,300 people. Subsidiaries include Holcim UK (the UK), and Holcim Apasco (Mexico). The company operates two business segments: building materials (decarbonized cement, circular aggregates) and building solutions (energy-efficient building systems, high performance concrete & surfacing).

Holcim is the cement market leader in Australia, Azerbaijan, India, Slovakia, Switzerland, and Latin America. It is among the top few producers throughout Europe and Asia. Globally, Holcim and Lafarge are the two largest producers in terms of sales as of 2014.

In 2024, Holcim announced its plans to add 1,000 units of the battery-electric truck from Mercedes-Benz Trucks to its European fleet, with both companies signing a joint letter of intent for this purpose. The volume represents the most significant planned single order for the eActros 600, which has contributed to the achievement of the sustainability goals of both companies.

Also, in 2024, Holcim announced plans to spin off its North American business, listing the North American business with a full capital market separation. On 23 June 2025, the company completed this process, with the listing of Amrize. Holcim will remain listed on the SIX Swiss Exchange and will execute its strategy NextGen Growth 2030 unveiled in March 2025.

== History ==
=== Foundation and development ===
Holcim was founded by Adolf Gygi in 1912 as "Aargauische Portlandcementfabrik Holderbank-Wildegg". The original headquarters were in Holderbank, (Lenzburg district, Canton of Aargau). In 1914, the company merged with "Rheintalischen Cementfabrik Rüthi" owned by Ernst Schmidheiny. Schmidheiny took over leadership duties and began the company on a course of expansion.

In 1922, Holderbank, as the company was then known, expanded beyond the Swiss borders into France. Schmidheiny continued to expand, primarily by buying stakes in existing companies. By the end of the decade Holderbank held stakes in Belgium, Germany, the Netherlands, and Egypt. Positions in Lebanon and South Africa soon followed. Schmidheiny died in the 1930s and his sons, Ernst Jr. and Max, took over the business, splitting it into two divisions. Ernst took over the Holderbank building materials business, while Max oversaw the other lines. This organization scheme remained in place until the 1970s.

After World War II, Hans Gygi, son of Adolf Gygi, took over leadership. He oversaw the company during the Swiss housing boom of the 1950s, and as Holderbank expanded into Canada, then throughout North and South America. The company went public in 1958 in order to raise more capital to fuel further expansion. Hydroelectric projects in Switzerland generated large concrete contracts, offsetting losses in Egypt when the country's government nationalized Holderbank's factories.

During the early 1970s, growth in Brazil and Mexico improved the company's bottom line. The Schmidheiny brothers convinced shareholders that the company should consolidate holdings and merge with Schweizerischen Cement-Industrie-Gesellschaft. The combined company had annual revenue of 800 million Swiss francs and established Holderbank as one of the industry's largest companies worldwide. The oil crisis of 1973 hit the industry hard as construction demand dried up in much of the world. Strong markets in Lebanon and South Africa allowed Holderbank to weather the storm. By 1976, revenue and profits had returned to pre-crisis levels.

In the late 1970s and early 1980s, Holderbank continued its expansion in Latin America and expanded into Asia and Spain for the first time. Thomas Schmidheiny took over leadership, overseeing the company as in expanded into Eastern Europe and experienced a boom in Spanish construction preceding the 1992 Summer Olympics. By 1986, Holderbank was the world's largest cement manufacturer. In the 1990s, the company consolidated its European holdings as the American market drove growth. Expansion into Eastern Europe and Russia continued.

In 2001, the company changed its name from "Holderbank Financière Glaris" to Holcim (short for Holderbank ciment). Asia drove growth in the 2000s, as the company saw more than 50% of its business come from emerging markets. In 2005, Holcim purchased Aggregate Industries for US$4.1 billion, entering the United Kingdom for the first time. That year, the company also expanded into India by acquiring a stakes in The Associated Cement Companies (ACC) and Ambuja Cement Eastern. In 2008, Holcim became the largest shareholder of China's Huaxin Cement with a 40% stake. In 2009, they acquired Cemex Australia.

In December 2025, it was announced that Holcim had acquired Thames Materials in the United Kingdom and A&S Recycling GmbH in Germany, and agreed to acquire a recycler in Northwest France. The three companies, with a combined capacity of about 1.3 million tonnes of construction and demolition materials annually.

In February 2012, Bernard Fontana became the first CEO of Holcim that was not part of the founding families.

=== Merger with Lafarge ===
On 7 April 2014, Holcim and Lafarge announced they had agreed to terms on a "merger of equals" valued at nearly $60 billion. The merger entails 10 Lafarge shares being converted into 9 Holcim shares. Holders of 86% of Lafarge shares accepted this offer in June 2015, according to Holcim, meaning that the merger would proceed. The new company would be based in Switzerland and have a manufacturing capacity of 427 million tons a year, which would vastly exceed the 227 million ton capacity of current industry leader Anhui Conch. Lafarge Chief Executive Officer Bruno Lafont will lead the new company, while Holcim's Wolfgang Reitzle will be chairman. Executives from both companies said the deal will save the new company 1.4 billion euros (US$1.9 billion) annually and create "the most advanced group in the building materials industry."

Analysts said the deal could lead to further mergers within the industry and give competitors a chance to pick up assets at a bargain price.

On 1 December 2024, Holcim announced that it would sell its 83.8% stake in Lafarge Africa Plc to China's Huaxin Cement for $1 billion, a move seen as part of Holcim's strategy to focus on high-growth regions and sustainable business practices. The sale would be finalized by 2025, pending regulatory approvals.

== See also ==
- Holcim Foundation for Sustainable Construction
- Holcim Foundation Awards for Sustainable Construction
