= Agricultural Mortgage Corporation (disambiguation) =

Agricultural Mortgage Corporation may refer to:

- Agricultural Mortgage Corporation, a subsidiary of Lloyds Banking Group in the United Kingdom
- Federal Agricultural Mortgage Corporation, commonly known as Farmer Mac in the United States

== See also ==
- ACC Loan Management, formerly the Agricultural Credit Corporation in the Republic of Ireland
