= Sinn Féin Bank =

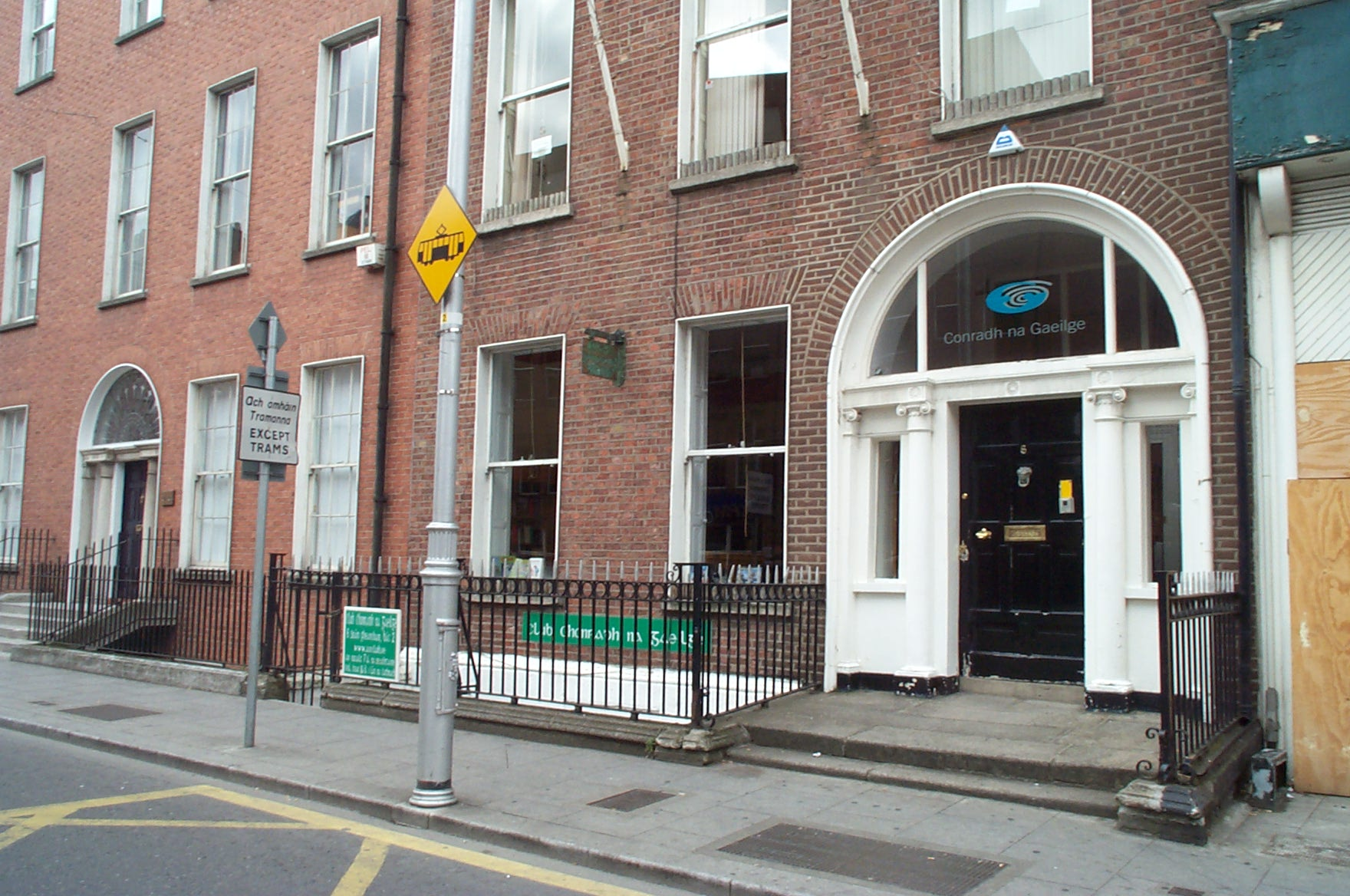
No. 6 Harcourt St, office of the Sinn Féin Bank 1910–21

The Sinn Féin Bank, formally the Sinn Féin Co-operative People's Bank, Ltd. (Irish: Coṁar-Ḃannc Sinn Féin, Teo.) was a co-operative bank in Ireland associated with the Sinn Féin movement, which operated from August 1908 to October 1921. The Sinn Féin Bank is sometimes confused with the National Land Bank, established as a friendly society in 1919 with Dáil backing and premises at 5 Harcourt Street.

== Foundation ==
The bank was established in 1908 to "carry out the business of banker and bill discounter, and of Dealer in Stocks, Shares, Bonds, Debentures and other Securities to assist in the development of Irish industries". Its founding council comprised George W. Russell, Arthur Griffith, and P. T. Daly. In 1910 it purchased headquarters at 6 Harcourt Street for £575, leasing the upper floors to the Sinn Féin party, from where the Sinn Féin newspaper was edited. A contemporary wrote, "we do not envy the man who has the job of persuading [nationalists] that the new Sinn Fein bank (which we take it will be established without complying with the requirements of British law) is a secure nest for his savings as the Bank of Ireland".

== War of Independence ==
When the First Dáil proclaimed an Irish Republic in 1919, it opened a "Trustees of Dáil Éireann" account at the Sinn Féin Bank for a "Self Determination Fund" of donations from supporters. The Department of Finance of the Dáil ministry under Michael Collins was also in 6 Harcourt Street in 1919. Kathleen Kearney met her husband Stephen Behan while working at the Sinn Féin Bank. Several times in 1919 and 1920, during the Irish War of Independence, the Dublin Metropolitan Police (DMP) raided and ordered the closure of 6 Harcourt Street. The bank's bookkeeping was deliberately complex, with proxy names for accounts held by republican leaders. In 1923 it was claimed that the authorities "were unable to make head or tail out of" the books it had confiscated.

On 29 November 1919, the martial law authorities ordered the bank to close, and on 2 January 1920, the DMP went to enforce this order. Based on cheques recovered in a DMP raid on 6 Harcourt Street on 27 February 1920, the Attorney-General for Ireland on 2 March 1920 ordered Hibernian Bank and Munster and Leinster Bank to give evidence at a private inquiry into their relations with the Sinn Féin Bank. The inquiry was led by Alan Bell, a resident magistrate, as part of his broader, mostly secret, search for Dáil funds. The banks' officials were reluctant to co-operate. On 26 March 1920, Bell was taken from a tram and shot by Collins' IRA "Squad". The bank secured through the courts the return of £8000 confiscated in the raid.

On 29 November 1920, the bank's office was damaged when the authorities took up the floorboards and blew open a secret underground safe. On 14 March 1921, the bank's manager, David Kelly, brother of Sinn Féin TD Thomas Kelly, was killed by crossfire on Great Brunswick Street. In the Second Dáil on 18 August 1921, Séamus Dwyer claimed "All the monies invested [in the Sinn Féin Bank] were in jeopardy".

== Liquidation ==
On 19 October 1921, the bank passed a resolution to wind up the company and appointing William O'Brien Hishon liquidator. The confiscated books were returned to Hishon "in a sack" after the June 1921 truce ended the Anglo-Irish War, and he set about deciphering them. Michael Collins told the Second Dáil on 26 April 1922 that the Sinn Féin Bank was "now in Liquidation"; of £201,944 8s. 4d. Trustees Accounts of Dáil funds, £1,660 7s. 5d. was in the Sinn Féin Bank and the rest in the London Office. By December 1923, Hishon had received £3,501 in moneys due and paid out £2,685, leaving a balance of £815. The provisional government established under the Anglo-Irish Treaty merged the institutions of the Irish Republic into those of the Dublin Castle administration into the new Irish Free State. On 16 April 1923, the Free State Chancery Division ordered the winding up of the Sinn Féin Bank company, appointing Donal O'Connor as liquidator. In August 1923 the court authorised O'Connor to auction off the Harcourt Street premises, which were "almost derelict". (In March 1966 they were bought by Conradh na Gaeilge.) The court ruled in December 1923 that the 1921 winding-up resolution was invalid, and ordered Hishon to transfer the £815 balance to O'Connor. The bank was dissolved by the High Court in March 1925 and its assets were liquidated. In April 1926, Dublin County Council, presented with a demand for £113 for damage caused by the DMP raids in 1919–21, voted 13–1 not to pay. The liquidation was completed by 1931 after proceedings costing £2,406 8s. 6d. The republican Dáil had deposited money with the bank and the Irish Free State, as its legal successor, received £1,198 10s. 9d. at the standard writedown of 50%, forgoing its preferential claim under the Dáil Éireann Loans and Funds Act, 1924. Other creditors received £2,620 7s. 0d. at the same rate. In 1933, the Free State voted £2,045 in public funds to repay creditors for the shortfall.

== See also ==
- List of banks in the Republic of Ireland
