= EBS d.a.c. =

- Type: Bank
- Industry: Financial services
- Founded: 1935
- Founder: Alexander McCabe; Thomas J. O'Connell
- Headquarters: 10 Molesworth Street, Dublin 2, D02 R126, Ireland
- Key people: Peter Hagan (Chairman); Paul Butler (Managing Director)
- Products: Mortgage, Savings, Personal Loans Current Accounts, Credit Card facility
- Number of employees: 300 (2018)
- Website: ebs.ie

EBS d.a.c. is a small financial institution in Ireland registered as a designated activity company.

== History ==
EBS Building Society was founded in 1935 by Alexander McCabe, Thomas J. O'Connell and other teachers to provide affordable housing finance for teachers and other civil servants.

EBS was one of the last two Irish building societies owned by their members but since July 2011, has been a subsidiary of AIB Bank. With 70 branches throughout Ireland, EBS offers residential, personal loans, savings accounts and investment products.

It formerly did not offer current accounts using its own resources and instead through an agreement with Allied Irish Banks, an ATM card service was operated using AIB's Banklink system. This has now been withdrawn and a debit card is provided in conjunction with MasterCard. Similarly, credit cards were formerly offered in conjunction with MBNA.

EBS Logo 1991-2011

In 2003, the EBS building society promoted a controversial product which involved parents remortgaging the family home to help their children buy a property. Called FamilyFirst, the product was aimed at first-time buyers and enabled parents to help raise the deposit on a starter home by taking out a loan with no repayments due for three years. After this period the parent takes on the repayments or the child can decide to pay off the parents' loan. The product drew extensive criticism when EBS promoted it in adverts in 2003. Critics charged that the product was a form of emotional blackmail and that parents were being forced into debt to fund their children's lifestyle.

In 2006, EBS became a tied insurance agent of Irish Life, PLC for the provision of life and investments products. All investment products sold through EBS are managed by Irish Life Investment Managers.

During 2007, a wholly owned subsidiary, Haven Mortgages, was established. Haven was intended to focus exclusively on the broker market as a separate lender in its own right.

On 18 September 2009, Fergus Murphy, the chief executive of Educational Building Society (EBS) admitted his financial institution had played a key role in helping to create an overheated economy. Eithne Tinney, a former EBS director has described a "feeding frenzy" which existed between lenders and developers in the lead-up to the crash and the bonus system in banks as "crazy". She said "The bonus system in banks is crazy. You get a bonus for lending money out. There is no incentive for getting it back in. Such a system encourages greed and recklessness". Ms Tinney was a member of the board of EBS from 2000 until 2007. She told the banking inquiry how she was "removed" from the board as she was considered a "troublemaker".

On 1 July 2011, EBS Building Society ceased to exist and, after being granted a banking licence, and demutualising, EBS Building Society became EBS Ltd., a subsidiary of AIB.

On 12 September 2016, EBS Limited re-registered as a designated activity company (d.a.c.), as required under the Companies Act 2014. The registered name of the legal entity is now EBS d.a.c.

== Controversy ==
In June 2010, the European Commission authorised the Irish government to inject €875 million as emergency rescue aid into the society to combat the post-2008 Irish banking crisis. This bailout money came with the demand that the EBS must submit a restructuring plan to the commission. The European Commissioner for Competition, Joaquín Almunia, said "EBS needs a significant recapitalisation to comply—and to continue to comply in the coming years—with capital requirement rules."

By March 2011 the total external bailout needed to save the institution was estimated at €1.5 billion.

The former head of EBS Building Society Fergus Murphy told the Oireachtas Banking Inquiry in 2015 there was a "very reasonable chance" the institution could have made it through the crash without being nationalised and merged with AIB if it had not got involved in land development and commercial property lending. "They got into it because they felt they were losing relevance" and "needed to create new profit pools", Mr Murphy told the committee. EBS became involved in commercial property lending in 2001/02 and in land and development loans in 2005. The combined loan book amounted to €1.7 billion by the end of 2007. Mr Murphy took over as chief executive of EBS in January 2008 and ceased its lending to commercial property and land development projects.

On 18 June 2018, EBS admitted that a further 500 customers were caught up in its tracker mortgage scandal, which brought the number of its customers affected to 2,400.

In November 2020 a financial advisor who was an employee of EBS and who stole a total €271,000 from elderly and vulnerable people was jailed for eleven months at Sligo Circuit Court. The court heard she had "not paid back a penny". Her victims said she had abused her position as a financial adviser and a "trusted employee."

In June 2022, the Central Bank of Ireland reprimanded and fined EBS d.a.c. trading as EBS €13.4m for a series of significant and long-running failings in the treatment of its mortgage customers, between August 2004 and June 2020. As a result of this investigation alone, EBS has admitted to 36 separate regulatory breaches. This fine was separate from the more than the €105m that EBS has been required to pay to date in redress, compensation and account balance adjustments to impacted customers.

== See also ==
- List of acronyms: European sovereign-debt crisis
- List of European cooperative banks
- List of banks in the Republic of Ireland
