= Resident magistrate (Ireland) =

Irish political position

In pre-independence Ireland, a Resident Magistrate was a stipendiary magistrate appointed to a county (outside of the Dublin Metropolitan Police District) to sit among the justices of the peace at Petty Sessions in that county. They were appointed by the Lord Lieutenant of Ireland (in reality, therefore, by the Dublin Castle administration in Ireland).

== Role ==
The role of resident magistrate was created on a somewhat trial basis in 1814, and extended to the entire country by the Constabulary (Ireland) Act 1836. The resident magistrate was supposed to sit amongst the justices at Petty Sessions—the courts of summary jurisdiction in pre-independence Ireland—and guide the justices to apply the law impartially. In reality they came to preside at Petty Sessions, and even sit alone without justices. RMs did not need to be legally trained in pre-independence Ireland, and many were ex-British Army officers. The "Resident" referred to the requirement that the magistrate live in the county to which he was assigned.

The role was often criticised as being under the influence of the Dublin Castle administration, and Irish politicians often cited the "RM" as really standing for "Removable Magistrate", since they held office at the Lord Lieutenant's pleasure and could be removed.

In some parts of western counties in the later 1800s at the time of the Famine, and then the Land War, it became hard to find enough suitably-educated local magistrates, and so an RM could be sent to help them. He was salaried and they were volunteers.

== Alan Bell ==
On 29 November 1919, the martial law authorities ordered the Sinn Féin Bank to close and the following year, on 2 January, the Dublin Metropolitan Police (DMP) went to enforce this order. Based on cheques recovered in a DMP raid on 6 Harcourt Street on 27 February 1920, the Attorney-General for Ireland on 2 March 1920 ordered Hibernian Bank and Munster and Leinster Bank to give evidence at a private inquiry into their relations with the Sinn Féin Bank. The banks' officials were reluctant to co-operate.

The inquiry was led by Alan Bell, a resident magistrate, as part of his broader, mostly secret, search for Dáil funds. He was tasked by the British to track down Sinn Féin funds; he had successfully confiscated over £71,000 from Sinn Féin's HQ and, by investigating banks throughout the country, was set to seize much more. In March 1920, Bell, from Banagher, County Offaly was killed. He was pulled from a tram in south Dublin and shot at point blank range by Collins' IRA "Squad".

== After Irish independence ==
The office of Resident Magistrate (RM) was a unique institution in the United Kingdom as applied to Ireland. In the 20th century, it evolved into the modern structure seen today in both Northern Ireland and the Republic of Ireland. In both jurisdictions, courts of summary jurisdiction—known as the District Court in the Republic and Magistrates’ Courts in Northern Ireland—are now presided over by legally qualified district judges sitting alone.

This system stands in sharp contrast to that of England and Wales, where magistrates’ courts are typically composed of a bench of three lay justices. Only a small number of these courts are staffed by paid, legally trained district judges. Similarly, in Scotland, Justice of the Peace Courts are primarily staffed by lay magistrates.

=== Republic of Ireland ===
In the part of Ireland that was to become the Irish Free State, Petty Sessions could not be held for many years due to the Irish War of Independence, restricting the role of the RMs. On 23 August 1922, the Provisional Government of Ireland placed all of the RMs on leave, and at the end of September 1922 it terminated all commissions of the peace, effectively dismissing all the RMs and justices of the peace. This was not quite the end of the office of Resident Magistrate, as it then proceeded to appoint 27 solicitors and barristers to the post. Although appointed to the position of Resident Magistrate, the Provisional Government only publicly described these individuals as District Justices, and brought in legislation in 1923 (the District Justices (Temporary Provisions) Act 1923) to officially change the name of the position. The Courts of Justice Act 1924 finally abolished the office and transferred its jurisdiction to the District Court of Justice. The Justices of the District Court continued to be popularly called District Justices until the position was renamed Judge of the District Court (or District Judge) in 1991.

=== Northern Ireland ===
The position continued as before in Northern Ireland until 1935, when the Summary Jurisdiction and Criminal Justice Act (Northern Ireland) was passed. From then on Resident Magistrates had to be legally qualified solicitors or barristers in Northern Ireland of at least six years' standing. Petty Sessions (which later became known as Magistrates' Courts) would henceforth consist solely of a resident magistrate sitting alone. Since the passing of the Justice (Northern Ireland) Act 2002, two lay magistrates sit with the district judge in Youth Court (criminal proceedings involving children) and Family Proceedings Court (family law) matters, but the judge still sits alone in other matters. Where lay magistrates sit with the judge, the judge presides and guides the lay magistrates in the law. The position was renamed District Judge (Magistrates Court) in 2008.

== In popular culture ==
The book Some Experiences of an Irish RM by Edith Somerville and Violet Florence Martin, published in 1899 focused on a fictional Irish RM, Major Yeates. Two sequels were written and a TV programme, The Irish R.M., produced by RTÉ and UTV, which ran between 1983 and 1985.
