= Justice Barrett (disambiguation) =

Amy Coney Barrett (born 1972) is an associate justice of the Supreme Court of the United States. Justice Barrett may also refer to:

- Reginald Barrett (born 1944), justice of the Supreme Court of New South Wales
- James Barrett (Vermont judge) (1814–1900), justice of the Vermont Supreme Court

== See also ==
- Judge Barrett (disambiguation)
- Max Barrett (judge) (born 1971), judge of the High Court of Ireland
