= Judge Barrett =

Judge Barrett may refer to:

- Amy Coney Barrett (born 1972), judge of the United States Court of Appeals for the Seventh Circuit before serving on the United States Supreme Court
- James E. Barrett (1922–2011), judge of the United States Court of Appeals for the Tenth Circuit
- Max Barrett (judge) (born 1971), judge of the High Court of Ireland
- Michael R. Barrett (born 1951), judge of the United States District Court for the Southern District of Ohio
- Stephen Barrett (Irish politician) (1913–1976), Irish circuit court judge for Sligo and later for Galway
- William H. Barrett (1866–1941), judge of the United States District Court for the Southern District of Georgia

== See also ==
- Justice Barrett (disambiguation)
