= List of banks in the Republic of Ireland =

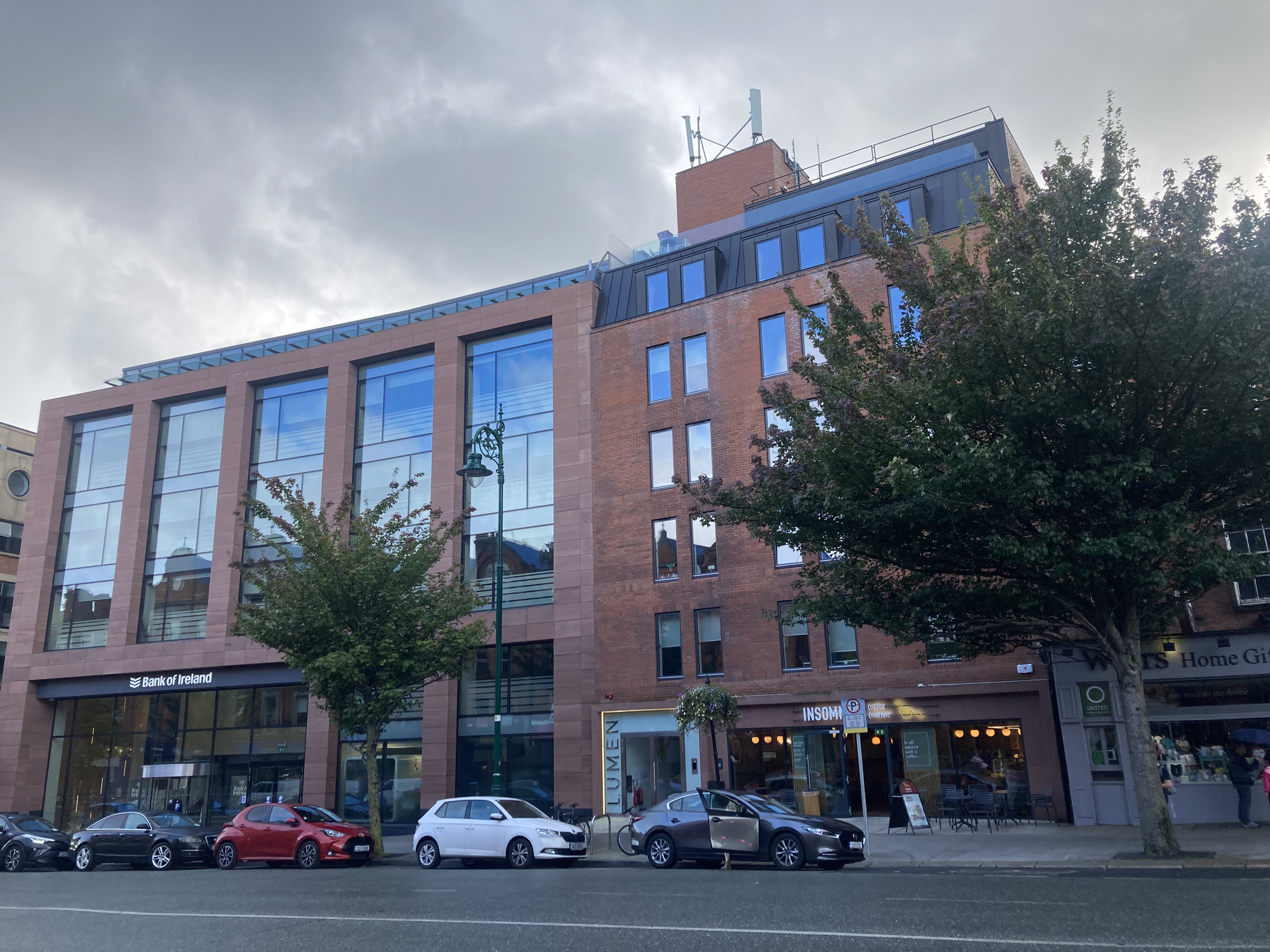
Bank of Ireland head office, Dublin

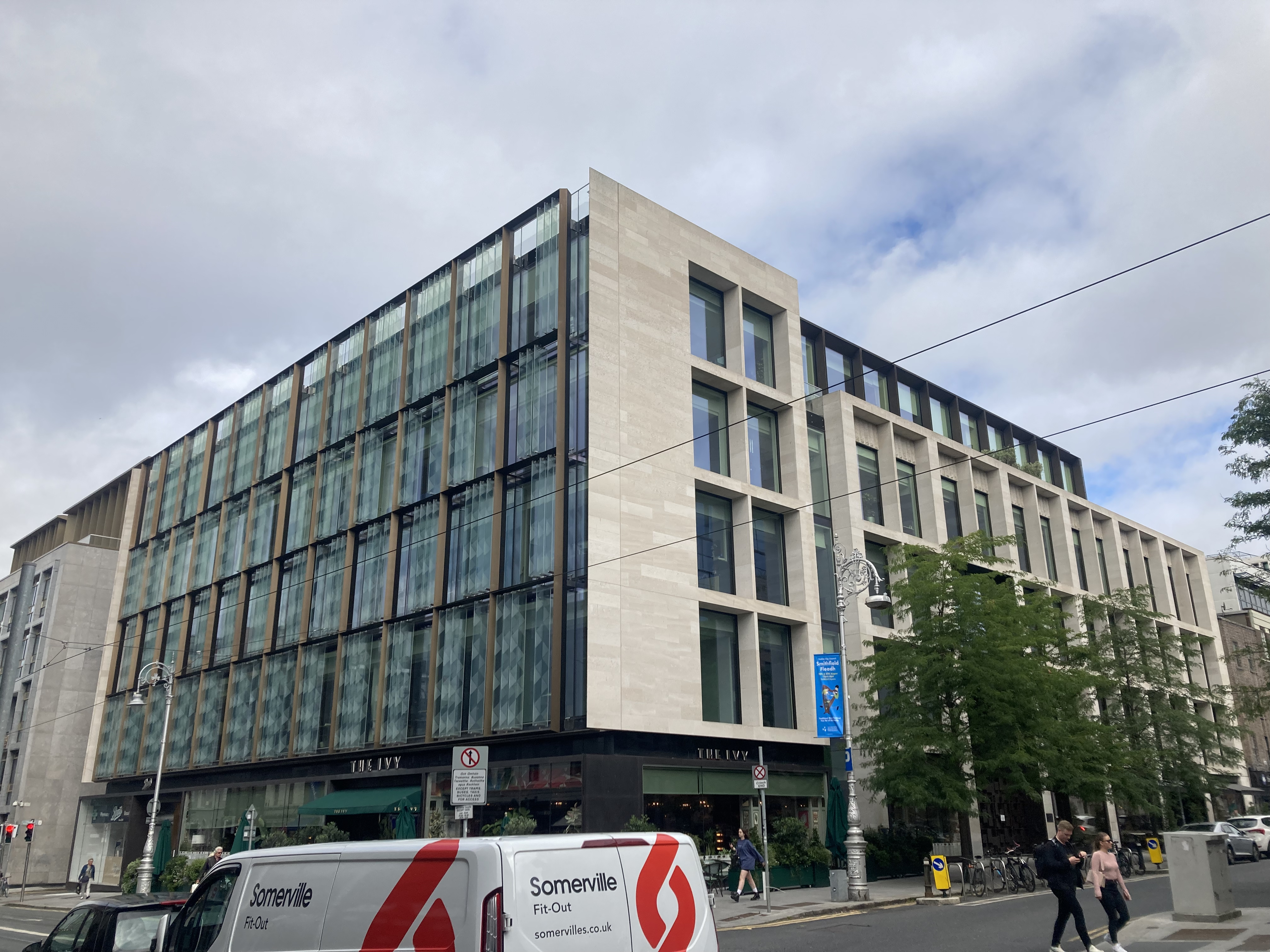
Barclays Bank Ireland head office, Dublin

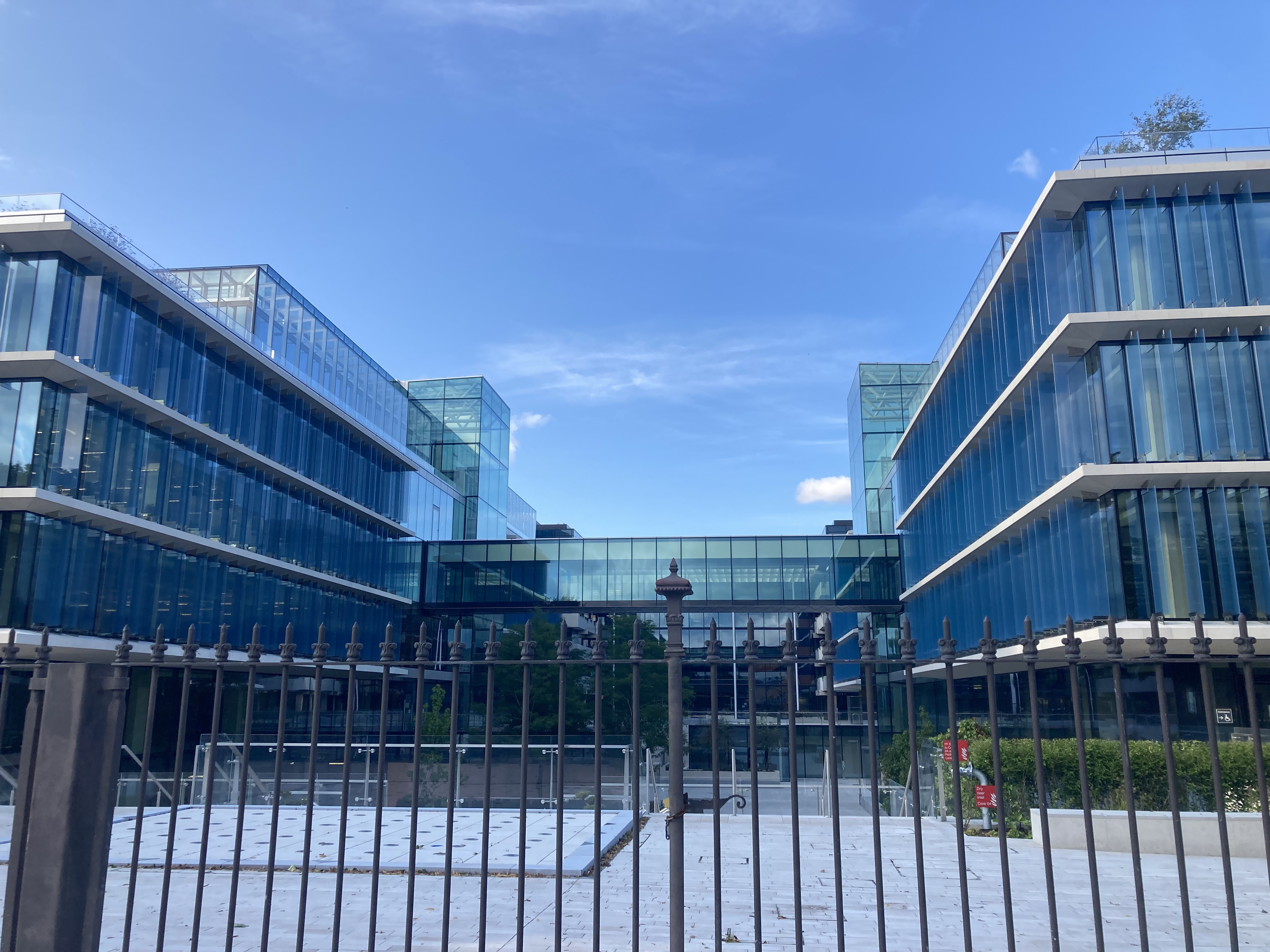
AIB head office complex, Dublin

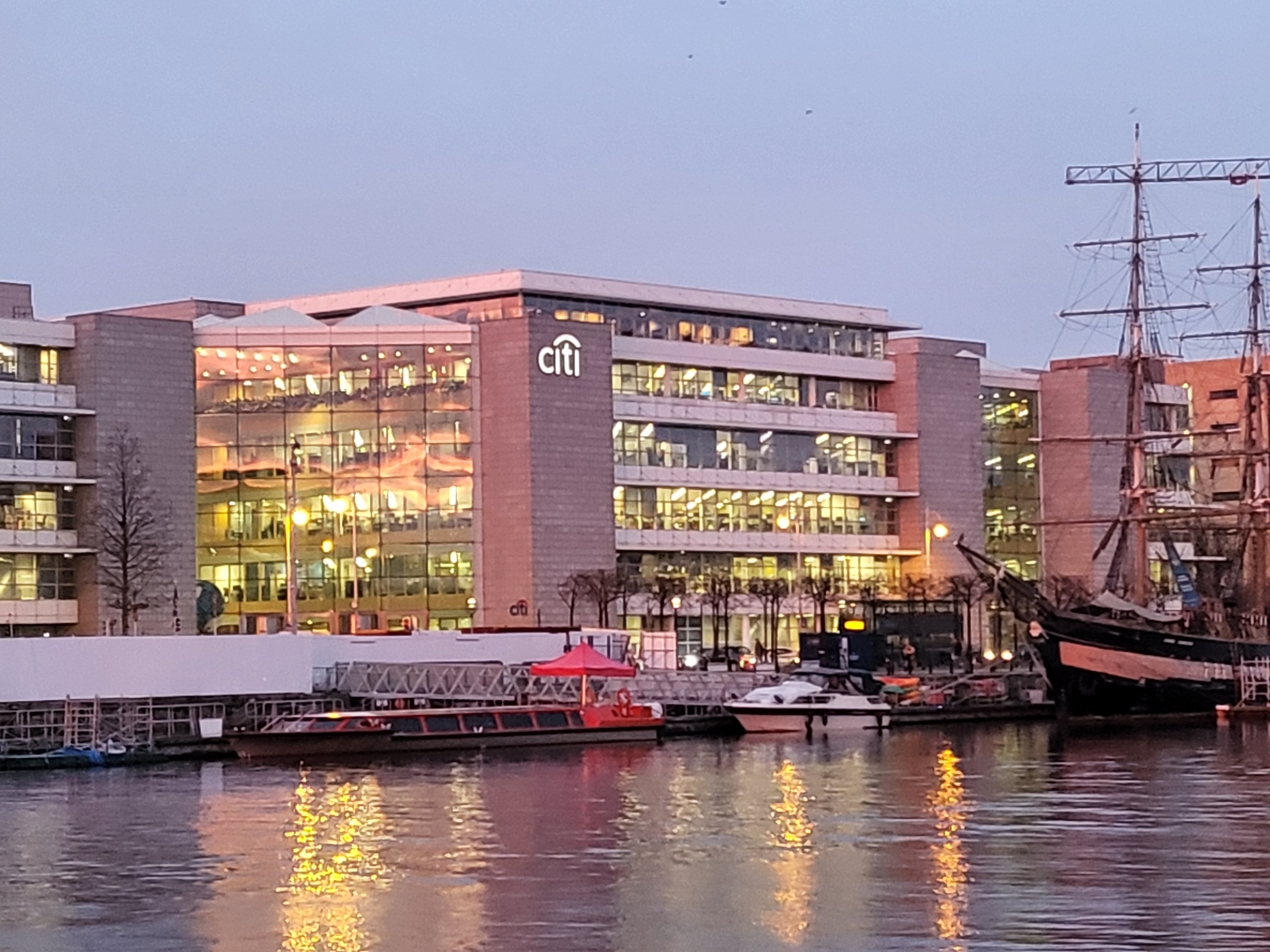
Citibank Europe head office, Dublin

The following list of banks in the Republic of Ireland is to be understood within the framework of the European single market and European banking union, which means that the Republic of Ireland's banking system is more open to cross-border banking operations than peers outside of the EU.

== Policy framework ==
European banking supervision distinguishes between significant institutions (SIs) and less significant institutions (LSIs), with SI/LSI designations updated regularly by the European Central Bank (ECB). Significant institutions are directly supervised by the ECB using joint supervisory teams that involve the national competent authorities (NCAs) of individual participating countries. Less significant institutions are supervised by the relevant NCA on a day-to-day basis, under the supervisory oversight of the ECB. In Ireland's case, the NCA is the Central Bank of Ireland.

== Significant institutions ==
As of 1 September 2025, the list of supervised institutions maintained by the ECB included the following five Irish banking groups as SIs, with names as indicated by the ECB for each group's consolidating entity:

- AIB Group plc
- BofA Europe Designated Activity Company, one of two intermediate parent undertakings of Bank of America in the EU
- Bank of Ireland Group plc
- Permanent TSB Group Holdings plc
- Barclays Bank Ireland plc (Barclays Group)
- Citibank Europe plc, one of two intermediate parent undertakings of Citigroup in the EU

A study published in 2024 suggested that as of end-2023, Bank of Ireland had the most assets located in the Republic of Ireland (€156 billion) followed by Barclays (€143 billion), Citibank Europe (€139 billion), AIB (€125 billion), and Bank of America Europe (€68 billion). In addition, Intesa Sanpaolo operates in Ireland via a subsidiary, whereas other euro-area SIs operate via branches. Conversely, the consolidated entity of Bank of Cyprus, a Cypriot SI, is an Irish public limited company, Bank of Cyprus Holdings plc.

== Less significant institutions ==
As of 1 September 2025, the ECB's list of supervised institutions included 15 Irish LSIs.

=== High-impact LSIs ===
Of these, the following three were designated by the ECB as "high-impact" on the basis of several criteria including size:

- Macquarie Bank Europe Designated Activity Company (Macquarie Group)
- permanent tsb Group Holdings plc, holding entity of permanent tsb plc (see below, other LSIs)
- Wells Fargo Bank International Unlimited Company (Wells Fargo Group)

=== Other Irish LSIs ===
Based on the same ECB list, there were no other domestic Irish LSIs except permanent tsb plc, subsidiary of the above-listed high-impact LSI permanent tsb Group Holdings plc.

=== Non-euro-area-controlled LSIs ===
Based on the same ECB list, 11 of the remaining 12 LSIs in Ireland were affiliates of non-euro-area financial groups, of which 3 branches and 8 susbidiaries:

- (Canada) Bank of Montreal Europe plc, subsidiary of Bank of Montreal
- (Denmark) Danske Bank (Ireland), Irish branch of Danske Bank A/S
- (United States) DFS BV, subsidiary of Dell
  - Dell Bank International Designated Activity Company, owned by DFS BV
- (United States) Hewlett-Packard International Bank Holding Limited (HP Group), subsidiary of HP Inc.
  - Hewlett-Packard International Bank Designated Activity Company
- (Sweden) Irish branch of Klarna Bank AB
- (Liechtenstein) Irish branch of LGT Bank AG
- (Canada) Scotiabank (Ireland) Designated Activity Company, subsidiary of Scotiabank
- (United States) USB European (Holdings) Limited, subsidiary of U.S. Bancorp
  - U.S. Bank Europe Designated Activity Company

As of October 2025, there were no branches of banks located outside the European Economic Area ("third-country branches" in EU parlance) in Ireland, based on data compiled by the European Banking Authority.

== Credit unions ==
The Republic of Ireland is one of six euro-area countries with credit unions, together with Croatia, Estonia, Latvia, Lithuania, and the Netherlands. Irish credit unions are small cooperative credit institutions outside the scope of the EU Capital Requirements Directives, and thus regulated and supervised under national law. At end-2023, there were 276 such Irish credit unions with total assets of ca. €24 billion (US$26 billion). Their umbrella organization is the Irish League of Credit Unions.

== Other credit institutions ==
Several other Irish credit institutions do not hold a banking license under EU law. These include the Central Bank of Ireland and Strategic Banking Corporation of Ireland, both of which are public credit institutions. The Republic of Ireland is also the home of several building societies, such as EBS d.a.c..

== Defunct banks ==
A number of former Irish banks, defined as having been based in the present-day territory of the Republic of Ireland, are documented on Wikipedia. They are listed below in chronological order of establishment. Several came to an end in the wake of the post-2008 Irish banking crisis, which also saw the short-lived establishment of the Irish Bank Resolution Corporation (2011-2013).

- Newcomen Bank (1722-1825)
- National Irish Bank (1809-2012)
- Guinness Mahon (1836-1998)
- Ulster Bank (1836-2025)
- First Active (1861-2009)
- Irish Nationwide Building Society (1873-2011)
- Sinn Féin Bank (1908-1921)
- Depfa Bank (1922-2022)
- Agricultural Credit Corporation (1927-2002)
- Anglo Irish Bank (1964-2011)
- Equity Bank (1965-2010)
- KBC Bank Ireland (1972-2024)
- Rabobank Ireland (1994-2018)
- First-e Group (1999-2001)
- Postbank (2003-2010)

== See also ==
- List of banks in the euro area
- List of banks in Europe
