= WBK =

WBK or wbk may refer to:

- Wielkopolski Bank Kredytowy, a defunct commercial bank based in Poland
- WBK, the station code for Warabrook railway station, New South Wales, Australia
- wbk, the ISO 639-3 code for Kalasha-ala, Afghanistan
