= Citibank Europe =

Subsidiary of Citigroup

Citibank Europe plc

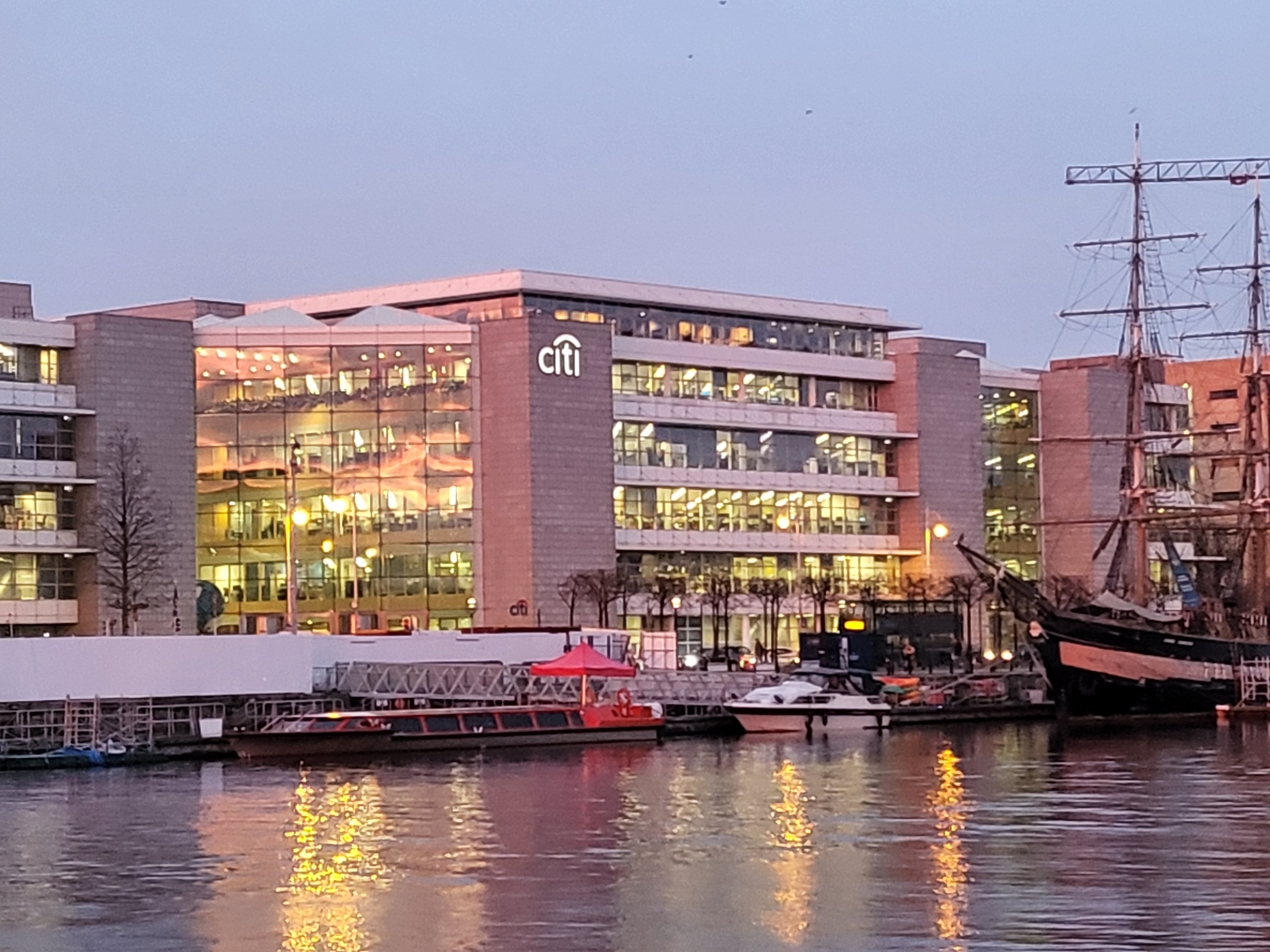
- Citibank Europe headquarters in the IFSC, Dublin
- Company type: Subsidiary
- Industry: Banking, financial services
- Founded: 1902; 124 years ago
- Headquarters: 1 North Wall Quay; Dublin 1 Republic of Ireland
- Area served: Europe, Middle East, Africa
- Products: Retail banking Commercial banking Investment banking Private banking Financial analysis
- Parent: Citigroup

Citibank Europe plc, is a subsidiary of Citigroup that operates in Europe. It is headquartered in Ireland.

== History ==
Citibank commenced operations in Ireland in 1965.

In 2015, the division shifted its retail banking headquarters from London to Dublin. At that time, it employed 4,300 people.

Also in 2015, the Hungarian retail operations were acquired by Erste Group.

In 2018, the company formed a new bank as a result of a reorganization due to Brexit.

In September 2023, CEO Kristine Braden resigned after less than a year on the job. The division also announced layoffs. Nacho Gutierrez-Orrantia was then named head of Citibank Europe.

== See also ==
- List of banks in Europe
- List of banks in the Republic of Ireland
