= Wielkopolski Bank Kredytowy =

Former Polish bank

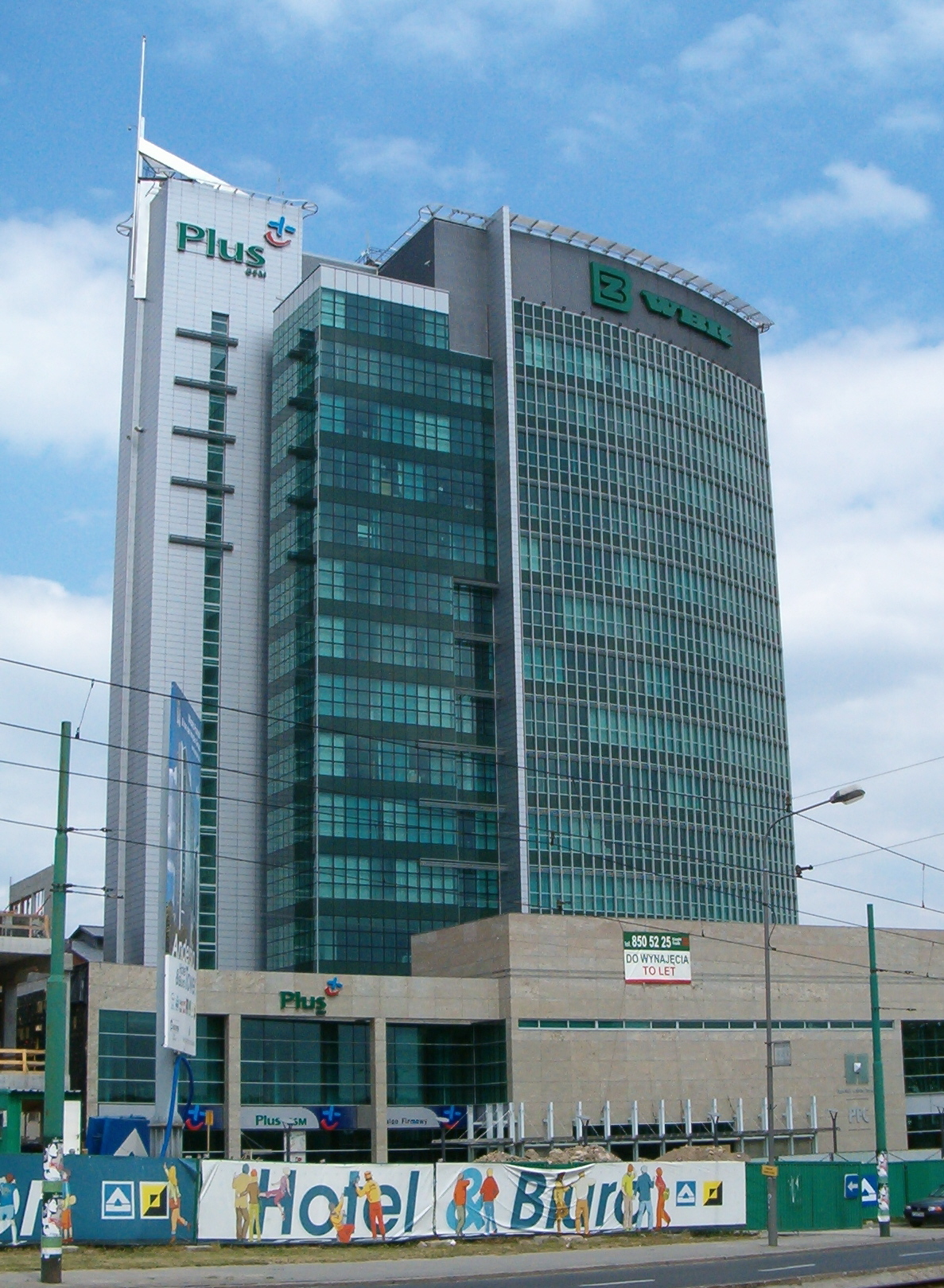
Bank WBK relocated its head office into the Poznań Financial Centre (here photographed in 2006) around the same time as it merged with Bank Zachodni in 2001

Wielkopolski Bank Kredytowy SA (lit. 'Credit Bank of Greater Poland'), also known as Bank WBK, was a bank based in Poznań, Poland. It was established in 1988-1989 by spinoff from the National Bank of Poland, majority-acquired in 2000 by Allied Irish Banks, and merged in 2001 with Bank Zachodni to form Bank BZ-WBK.

== Overview ==
Bank WBK was one of nine banks spun off in the late 1980s from the National Bank of Poland, the culmination of a sequence of reforms during the 1980s that brought an end to the country's single-tier banking system. It was subsequently reorganized as a joint-stock company in 1991. It was then floated on the Warsaw Stock Exchange in 1993, a successful transaction thanks to the intervention of the European Bank for Reconstruction and Development (EBRD) which acquired a 28.5 percent ownership stake.

Allied Irish Banks (AIB) acquired a 16.3-percent stake in 1995, and raised it gradually to reach 60 percent by 2000. AIB had previously acquired an 80-percent stake in Bank Zachodni, and merged the two regional banks in 2001 to form Bank BZ-WBK.

== See also ==
- List of banks in Poland
