= Max Barrett (judge) =

Irish solicitor, High Court judge since 2014

The Hon. Mr. Justice Max Barrett

Judge of the High Court
- Incumbent
- Assumed office 8 January 2014
- Nominated by: Government of Ireland
- Appointed by: Michael D. Higgins

Personal details
- Born: 1971 (age 54–55)
- Education: Trinity College Dublin; University College Dublin; University of Salford; Dublin City University; Law Society of Ireland

Max Barrett (born 1971) is an Irish judge who has served as a Judge of the High Court since January 2014.

== Legal career ==
Barrett is a graduate in law from Trinity College Dublin, holds a first class MA in Competition Law from King's College London, a PhD in law from the University of Salford (where he also won a full scholarship) and is an accredited arbitrator. He also holds a first-class honours MA in literature from Dublin City University. Barrett trained as a solicitor with McCann FitzGerald, qualifying in 2001. He subsequently worked as a solicitor in Bailhache Labesse, Bank of Ireland and as Head of Legal in Rabobank. He became Head of Legal at Danske Bank Ireland in 2007. Following the nationalisation of Anglo Irish Bank in 2010, he was appointed company secretary, a role he continued in its successor Irish Bank Resolution Corporation until 2012. He was Head of Legal at SEB International Assurance until his appointment as a judge.

Barrett is a prolific writer and has published on a variety of legal topics. He has written several legal texts on financial law, in addition to a series of case-law indices published by Blackstones as well as a book on the judicial functions of the House of Lords, which was published by Palgrave MacMillan, His book The Art and Craft of Judgment Writing was published in 2022, with a second edition emerging in 2025, His book Great Legal Writing: Lessons from Literature, was published in 2023. In 2025, he published Online Dispute Resolution - Law's Future in the Digital Age. All three of these latest works were published by Globe Law.

== Judicial career ==
Barrett was appointed to the High Court in January 2014. He is one of the youngest judges to have been appointed in Ireland, as well as being one of only five to have continued his studies to doctoral level. He is also one of the most prolific, having delivered as many as 459 written judgments in under five years by early December 2020. He has heard cases involving defamation law, judicial review, injunctions, the law of tort, company law, competition law and family law. Barrett has been critical of high fees generated by legal professionals and argued that a systemic solution is needed to tackle the "crushing cost" of High Court litigation.

As of 2021, he was the judge in charge of competition law matters in the High Court.

=== Environmental cases ===
In Merriman v. Friends of the Irish Environment (2017), Barrett held that an unenumerated right to the environment exists in the Irish constitution, arising out of a case regarding extending planning permission for a runway at Dublin Airport. The case has not been overruled. However, the now-retired Chief Justice Frank Clarke did note in a 2020 Supreme Court decision that such a right had not yet been established by the Supreme Court and argued it was of a "very vague nature". The conservative approach taken by the Clarke Supreme Court contrasted markedly with the approach adopted by courts in many other jurisdictions, however, including the German Federal Constitutional Court, which has held national climate targets and permitted emissions to have violated fundamental rights.

=== Immigration, international protection and citizenship ===
In A v. Minister for Justice and Equality (2019), Barrett set aside a decision of the Minister for Justice and Equality which refused an application for family reunification, on the basis that a section of the International Protection Act 2015 was unconstitutional. Section 56(9)(a) did not recognise marriages of refugees for family reunification purposes which took place after arriving in Ireland. Although the case was concerned with a heterosexual marriage, it also impacted positively on LGBT+ couples who may not have been in a position to marry in countries of initial origin where same-sex marriage is not legal.

Jones v Minister for Justice and Equality (2019) was the subject of some political focus. Barrett refused to hold the Minister had been wrong in law to refuse the application for naturalisation of an Australian citizen who had been outside Ireland for 100 days prior to his application. The ruling held that the requirement in the Irish Nationality and Citizenship Act 1956 for one year's continuous residence for the period prior to an application must be given a literal reading, and concluded that there was no basis for the Department of Justice and Equality's discretionary policy of permitting six weeks absence from Ireland.

The implied effect of the judgment anyone seeking Irish citizenship would become ineligible if they broke the chain of one year's continuous residence. Researcher Conor O’Neill observed however that exactly this approach had been intended by the Government of the 15th Dáil. Barrett expressly anticipated in his judgment that it was for the Oireachtas to amend the legislation. The Court of Appeal subsequently dismissed an appeal from Barrett's ruling, noting that the trial judge had correctly concluded that the Minister's ‘finding’ was neither materially wrong nor irrational. but also held by majority that the lower court ruling on the construction of the legislation requiring unbroken residence in Ireland had been "overly literal", and set the ruling aside in that one respect. Because of the latter finding, any need for legislation (which the Minister had indicated would, if needed, be adopted "as an urgent priority") did not arise.

=== Heritage-related cases ===
In a 2016 case involving the relatives of the Easter Rising, he declared that Moore Street was a National Monument in 2016 in a 399-page judgment. Though welcomed by campaigners and some politicians, the decision was overturned by the Court of Appeal in 2018.
