= Bank Zachodni =

Polish bank

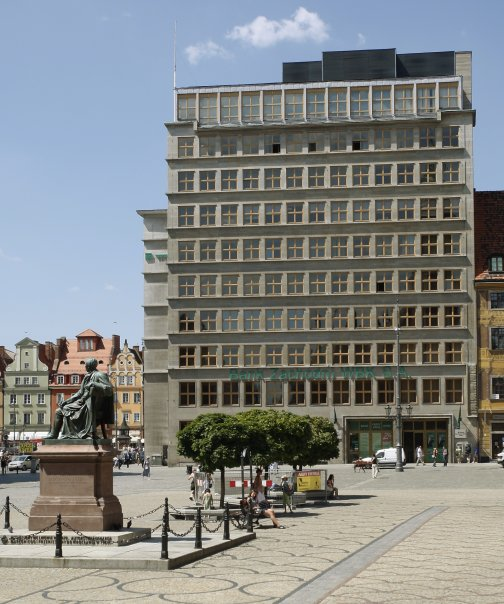
Main Building, Wrocław

Bank Zachodni (lit. 'Western Bank') was a bank based in Wrocław, established in 1988-1989 by spinoff from the National Bank of Poland. It was acquired in 1999 by Allied Irish Banks, then merged in 2001 with Wielkopolski Bank Kredytowy in 2001 to form Bank BZ-WBK, later part of Santander Group (2010-2026) and Erste Group (from 2026).

== Overview ==
Bank Zachodni was one of nine banks spun off in the late 1980s from the National Bank of Poland, the culmination of a sequence of reforms during the 1980s that brought an end to the country's single-tier banking system.

Allied Irish Banks (AIB) acquired 80 percent of its shares at the height of Poland's banking sector privatization drive in 1999. AIB separately acquired a 60-percent stake in Wielkopolski Bank Kredytowy, and merged the two regional banks in 2001 to form Bank BZ-WBK.

== See also ==
- List of banks in Poland
