= Strategic Banking Corporation of Ireland =

Irish state-owned bank

- Founded: 2015; 11 years ago
- Key people: Colin Moran (CEO)

The Strategic Banking Corporation of Ireland (SBCI) is a public bank that was established in 2015 in the wake of the Irish banking crisis to provide finance for small and medium-sized businesses. At the time it was set up, many of Ireland's main banks were unable or unwilling to provide to businesses. The Strategic Banking Corporation of Ireland does not provide loans directly to businesses themselves, but instead provides finance to the main banks at low cost, with the idea that the money is then loaned on to business. As of 2016, the bank had provided €347m to small businesses. Its Chief executive is Colin Moran.

== See also ==
- List of national development banks
- List of banks in the Republic of Ireland
