= First-e Group =

A first-e maestro card issued in 2000

First-e was a European online bank during the Dot-com bubble of 1999–2001. The company was based in Dublin, Ireland and employed 280 people, with 250,000 customers. It operated on a licence from French bank Banque d'Escompte, an innovation that allowed it to get around the usual difficulties faced by European banking startups. It launched with €200m in funding from various institutions including Intel, Morgan Stanley and Apax Partners and initially targeted the British market with a savings interest rate 2% higher than its high-street competitors, and gained 250,000 customers.

A 2.4 billion euro merger with the Spanish online bank Uno-e was proposed in 2000, but after the dotcom bubble burst in late 2000, parent company of Uno-e, BBVA called off the merger was in April 2001 and instead paid some €350m in compensation. First-e then sold its business to Direkt Anlage Bank of Germany in October 2001.

First-e was owned by the Enba group of companies, created by Gerhard Huber, Peter Phillips, Christian Kaiser, Nicholas Malcomson and Xavier Azalbert. Its Board included Sean Donlon, a former Irish ambassador to the US and the late Sir Nicholas Redmayne who was also its chairman.

== See also ==
- Egg Banking
- smile.co.uk
- List of banks in the Republic of Ireland
