= Bank Zachodni-WBK =

Former Polish bank

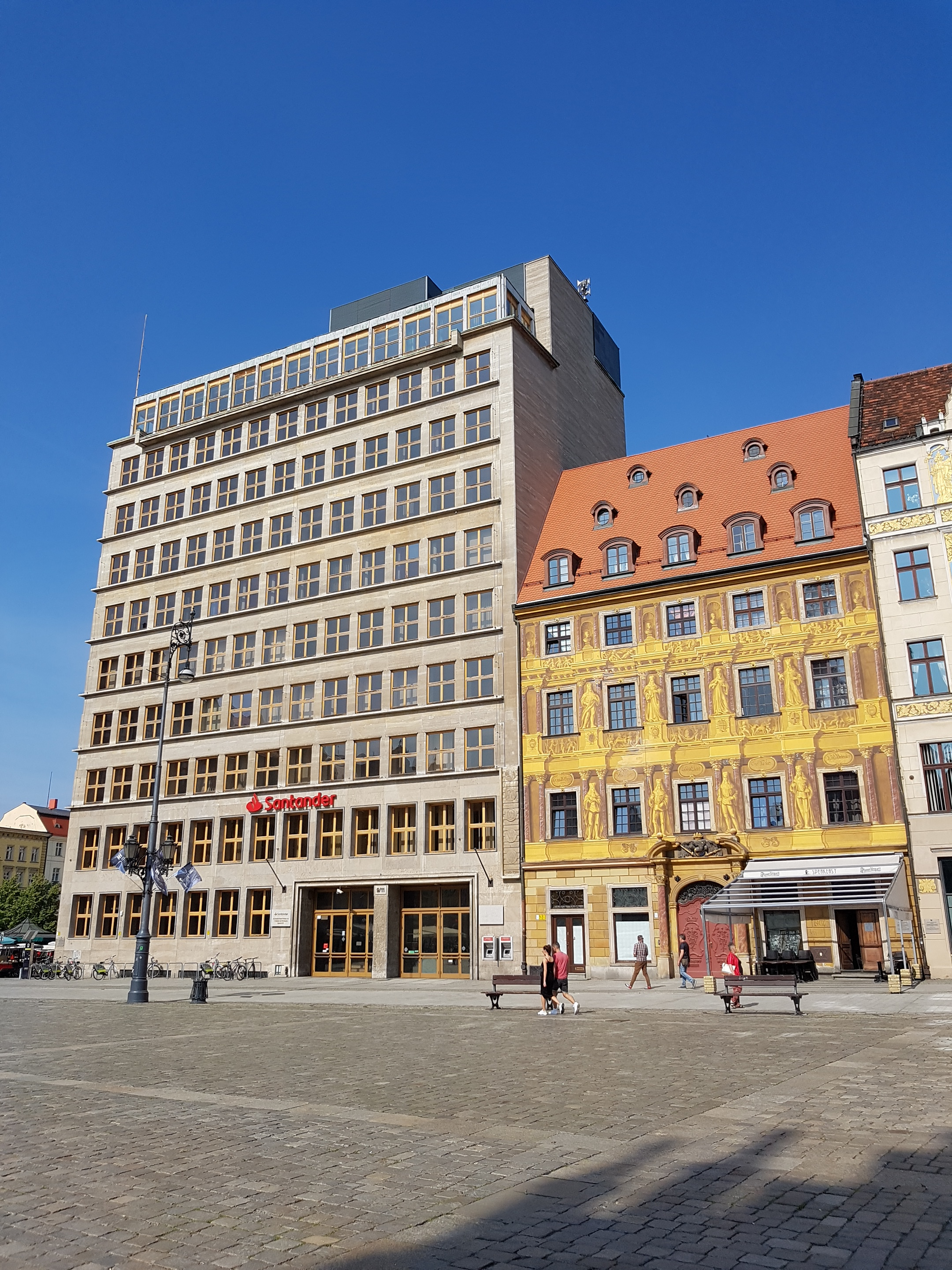
Former head office in Wrocław, photographed in 2019 with the Santander brand

Bank Zachodni-WBK or BZ-WBK was a bank with dual headquarters in Poznań and Wrocław, Poland, created in 2001 by merger of Bank Zachodni with Wielkopolski Bank Kredytowy. Initially controlled by Allied Irish Banks, it was acquired in 2010 by the Santander Group which rebranded it in 2018 as Santander Bank Polska, with its head office relocated that same year to Warsaw. Santander eventually sold a controlling stake in 2026 to Erste Group, which renamed the bank as Erste Bank Polska.

== History ==
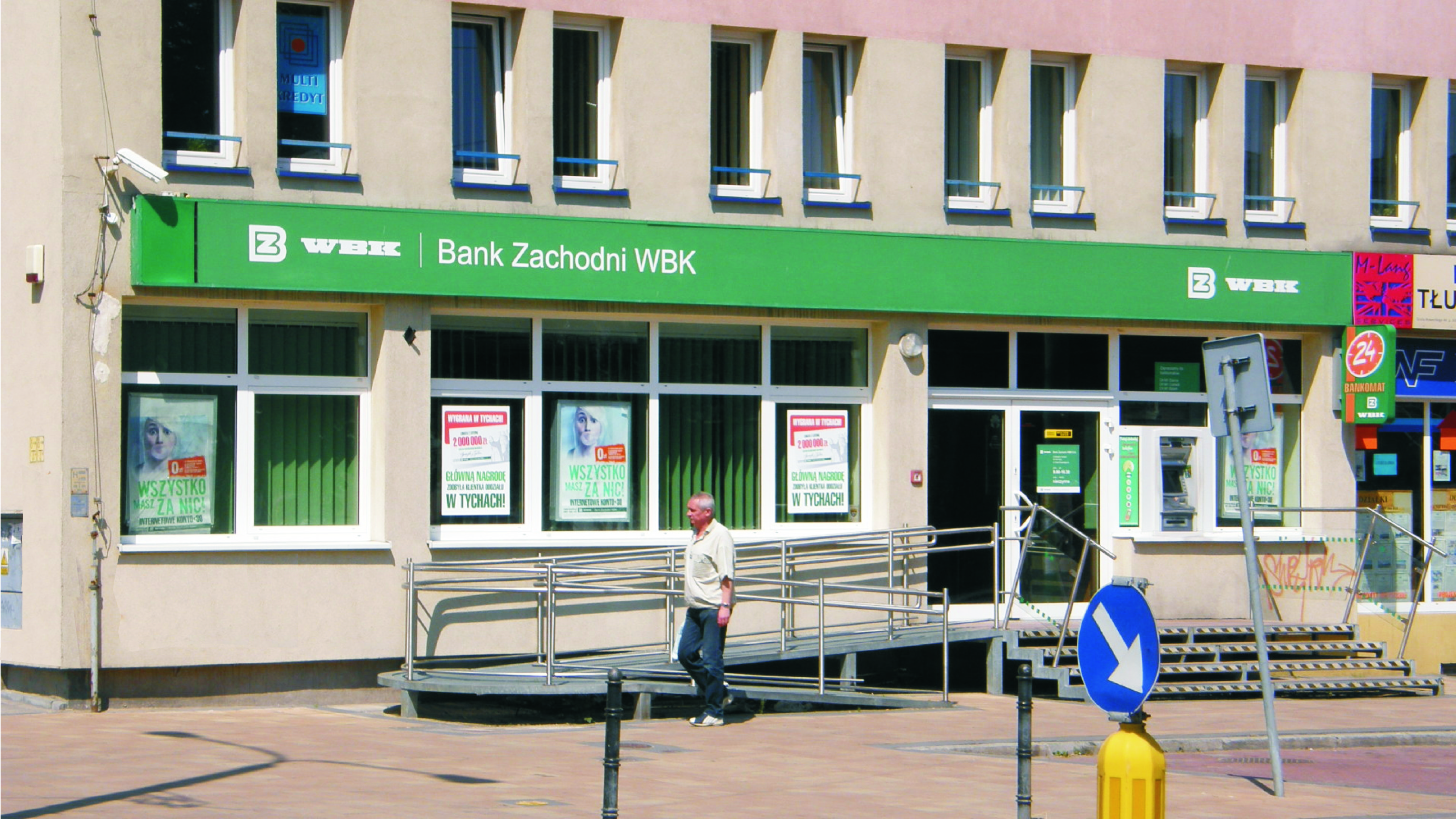
BZ-WBK branding on a branch in Tychy, photographed in 2009

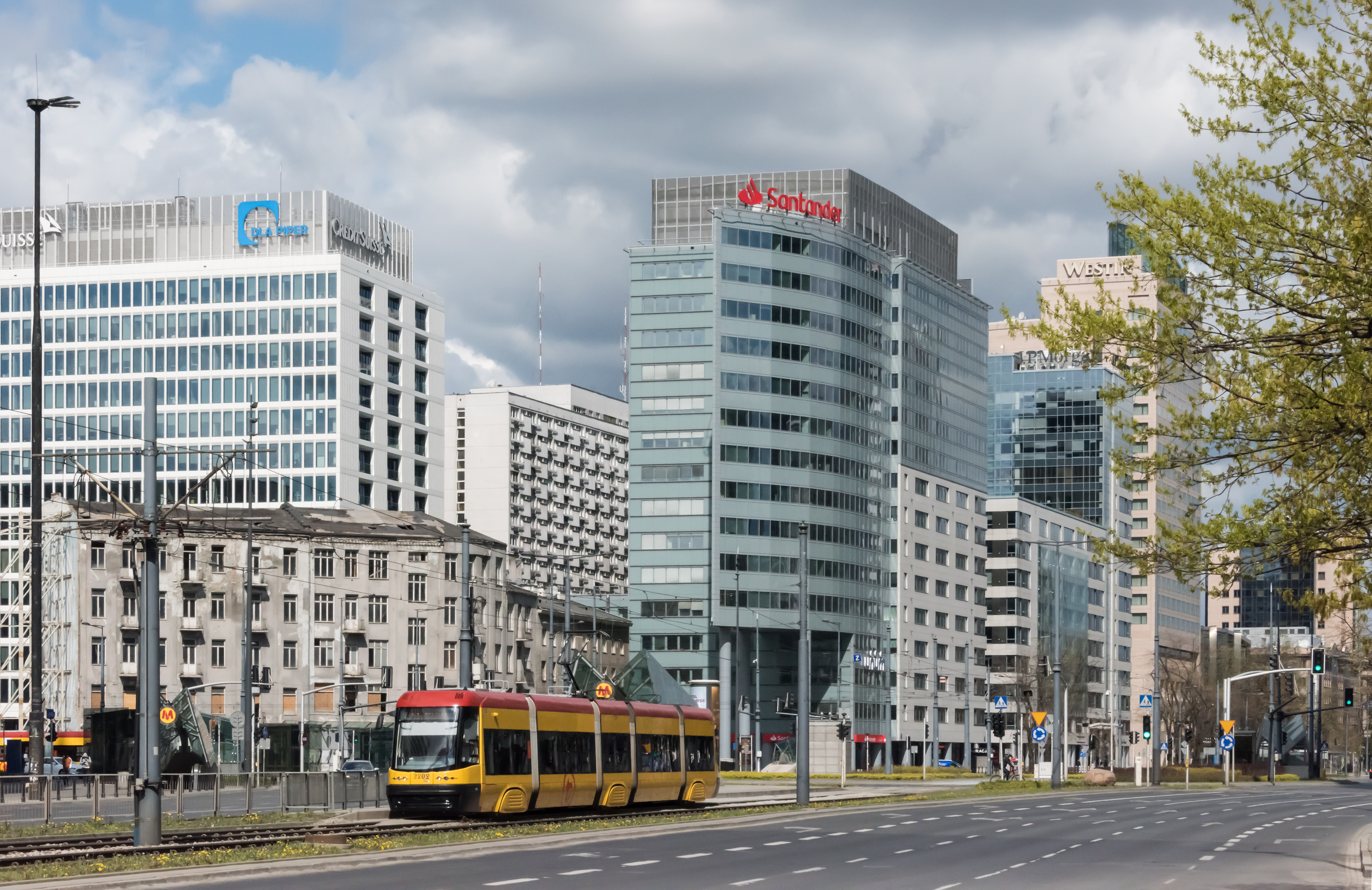
Head office in Warsaw following the 2018 relocation

Allied Irish Banks (AIB) had acquired 16.2% of shares in Bank WBK from the Polish State Treasury in March 1995. In the following years, the group acquired more WBK shares and separately a majority stake (80 percent) in Bank Zachodni in 1999. On 13 June 2001, pursuant to the resolution of the Polish Commission for Banking Supervision dated 7 March, Bank Zachodni-WBK was established. On 23 June 2001, the bank's shares were floated on the Warsaw Stock Exchange (WSE).

On 30 March 2010, AIB announced the intention to sell its stake in Bank Zachodni WBK, and on 10 September these intentions were confirmed by announcing the Santander Group as the buyer, which was to acquire 70.36% of shares worth EUR 3,1bn from AIB. On 30 March 2011, in a tender offer, Santander acquired 69,912 m company shares taking up 95.67% of its stake.

In 2012, the Santander Group reached an agreement with KBC Group on the acquisition of Kredyt Bank, then merged Kredyt Bank into BZ-WBK. Bank Zachodni WBK S.A. became the legal successor of Kredyt Bank in early 2013. The name Kredyt Bank was kept as trademark for some products.

On 7 September 2018, BZ-WBK was officially rebranded as Santander Bank Polska, and its headquarters were transferred to Warsaw. In the last quarter of 2018, the Polish retail operations of Deutsche Bank were absorbed by Santander Bank Polska.

The bank had 369 branches in Poland by 2023, complemented by franchisee partner outlets managed by individuals who cooperated based on agency agreements and offered select products and services; as of 2023 there were 421 such partners. In June 2025, Santander announced the sale of 49% of the bank to the Vienna-based Erste Group. The transaction was completed in early 2026, followed by rebranding as Erste Bank Polska.

== Marketing ==
Before the acquisition by Santander, Bank Zachodni WBK used to create its image, among others, by means of advertisement/commercial campaigns which featured international celebrities. Among the celebrities who starred in the commercials were: John Cleese, co-founder and member of Monty Python Group, comedian Danny DeVito, selector of Poland's national football team, Leo Beenhakker, French actor, Gérard Depardieu, Antonio Banderas and Chuck Norris. In April of 2013, Izabela Kuna joined the campaign and advertised the newest BZ-WBK product at the time – "Worth Recommending Account" with Norris.

== See also ==
- List of banks in Poland
