= Dáil loans =

The Dáil loans were bonds issued in 1919–1921 by the Dáil (parliament) of the self-proclaimed Irish Republic to raise the Dáil funds or Republican funds, used to fund the state apparatus the Republic was attempting to establish in opposition to the Dublin Castle administration of the internationally recognised United Kingdom of Great Britain and Ireland. The subscribers were Irish nationalists, in Ireland for the Internal Loan and in the United States for the External Loan.

== Raising of loans ==
When Michael Collins was appointed Minister for Finance in the Dáil Ministry on 2 April 1919, the First Dáil authorised him to use anti-conscription funds raised in 1917–1918, "Republican Bonds", and other funding. The Dáil approved the First Dáil Loan on 19 June 1919. This was for £500,000, half in an Internal Loan raised in Ireland, half in an External Loan raised in the United States ($1.25m at an exchange rate of $4.50 to the pound). Both were oversubscribed, and the External limit was increased in August 1919 to $25m. The money raised was held in bank accounts in Ireland and the United States controlled by three trustees: Éamon de Valera, President of Dáil Éireann; Michael Fogarty, the Catholic Bishop of Killaloe; and James O'Mara. £25,000 worth of gold was buried in concrete in Batt O'Connor's garden. On 27 March 1920, Alan Bell, a resident magistrate investigating bank accounts linked to the Dáil, was taken from a tram and shot by Collins' IRA "Squad". The Second Dáil on 26 August 1921 approved the Second Dáil Loan of £500,000 internal and $20,000,000 external, which was launched in America on 15 October 1921 and raised $700,000 before being suspended after the Anglo-Irish Treaty of 6 December 1921. About $2,500,000 of the total of $5,800,000 raised in America had been sent to the Dáil Ministry in Ireland by then.

=== Internal loan ===
The Cork Examiner was closed by the military authorities in 1919 for publishing the prospectus of the internal loan.

Origin of internal loan subscriptions
| Area | Amount (£) |
|---|---|
| Connacht | 57,797 |
| Munster | 171,177 |
| Leinster | 87,444 |
| Ulster | 41,297 |
| Great Britain and France | 11,647 |
| Cumann na mBan | 801 |
| Total | 370,163 |

=== External loan ===
Patrick McCartan was appointed ambassador to the United States by the First Dáil. De Valera went on a fundraising tour of America from June 1919 to December 1920. O'Mara went to the United States in September 1919 and liaised with the Friends of Irish Freedom. O'Mara fell out with de Valera over management of the funds and resigned his post in May 1921. De Valera replaced him with his brother Stephen M. O'Mara. The amount raised by the first loan was about $5,100,000 external and £375,000 internal.

== Reimbursement of funds ==
The Dáil split over the Treaty and the pro- and anti-Treaty factions agreed to freeze the bank accounts until the situation was resolved. The Irish Civil War of 1922–1923 was won by the forces of the Irish Free State established under the 1921 treaty. The Free State Oireachtas' Dáil Eireann Loans and Funds Act, 1924 vested the Dáil loan funds in its Minister for Finance. In 1925, the Free State courts released the Dáil funds in Irish bank accounts to the Free State Executive Council, which undertook to redeem the bonds. As regards Dáil funds in bank accounts in the United States, bondholders were divided between the "Hearn Committee", led by de Valera supporter John J. Hearn, and the "Noonan Committee", led by Bernard Noonan. Noonan felt the Free State should control the funds and redeem them; Hearn argued they should preferably go to Sinn Féin as leaders of the rump Irish Republic, or failing that be returned to subscribers. In 1927, the Supreme Court of New York ruled against Noonan, on the basis that the Free State was successor to the United Kingdom but not to the Irish Republic; it further ruled that the funds should be returned to subscribers, as "the purpose for which the moneys were subscribed by the so-called bondholders, that is, the establishment of a Republic of Ireland free and independent of any allegiance to Great Britain, was never accomplished". De Valera, now leader of the opposition Fianna Fáil party, urged his American supporters to use their refunds to invest in The Irish Press newspaper. The Executive Council refused to allow the trustees to implement the New York court decision until after the 1932 general election, when the first Fianna Fáil government took office. Repayment was "effectively completed" by 1936, under the Dáil Eireann Loans and Funds (Amendment) Acts of 1933 and 1936.
