= Agricultural Mortgage Corporation =

Subsidiary of Lloyds Banking Group in the United Kingdom

Agricultural Mortgage Corporation plc
- Type: Subsidiary
- Industry: Commercial banking
- Founded: 12 November 1928; 97 years ago
- Headquarters: Andover, Hampshire, England, UK
- Products: Agricultural mortgages
- Parent: Lloyds Banking Group
- Website: www.amconline.co.uk

Agricultural Mortgage Corporation Act 1958 (Note: Section 2.)
- Act of Parliament
- Parliament of the United Kingdom
- Long title: An Act to enlarge the amounts which may be advanced to the Agricultural Mortgage Corporation Limited by the Minister of Agriculture, Fisheries and Food for the purpose of increasing the Corporation's guarantee fund, and to extend the period during which the Minister may give the Corporation assistance by way of annual grant or loan.
- Citation: 7 & 8 Eliz. 2. c. 2
- Territorial extent: United Kingdom

Dates
- Royal assent: 18 December 1958
- Commencement: 18 December 1958 (Note: The Acts of Parliament (Commencement) Act 1793.)
- Repealed: 16 June 1977

Other legislation
- Repealed by: Statute Law (Repeals) Act 1977

Status: Repealed

Text of statute as originally enacted

Agricultural Mortgage Corporation plc (AMC) was formed in 1928 under the Agricultural Credits Act, to provide long term mortgages for land and redeveloping farming and rural-based businesses. Initially jointly owned by the Bank of England and the main clearing banks, it was purchased outright by Lloyds Bank in 1993 and is currently a wholly owned subsidiary of Lloyds Banking Group.

== History ==
Following the first world war, there was a crisis in farming, with too few people owning land. The Government identified a need for long term finance in the agricultural industry to satisfy an investment demand. AMC was created to revitalise land ownership to get a new generation of farmers onto their own land and farming to feed the nation.

Prior to 1991, AMC's activities were constrained by statute. In 1993, Lloyds Bank acquired the balance of the share capital from the Bank of England, Barclays Bank, Midland Bank, National Westminster Bank and the Royal Bank of Scotland. As a condition of the sale, it continues to run the organisation as an independent company under its own name.

== See also ==
- Lloyds Development Capital
- ACC Loan Management
