= Rabobank (Ireland) =

Rabobank (Ireland) consisted of three banking entities in Ireland which were part of the Dutch owned Rabobank Group. The three Irish based businesses were Rabobank (Ireland) plc, ACC Loan Management and RaboDirect Ireland.

Rabobanks first came to Ireland in 1994 when it established the commercial bank RaboBank (Ireland) plc in the IFSC in Dublin. In 2002 Rabobank bought the Agricultural Credit Corporation (ACC Bank) from the Irish government for €165 million. In 2005 Rabo launched its online savings bank RaboDirect which provides online savings accounts and savings products such as PRSA's.

RaboDirect ceased operations on 16 May 2018 and no longer operates banking services. The loan portfolios owned by ACC Loan Management were sold in 2019. Rabobank continues to provide corporate and wholesale banking services through a Dublin branch of Dutch company Coöperatieve Rabobank U.A.

== See also ==
- List of banks in the Republic of Ireland
