= ACC Loan Management =

ACC Loan Management Limited, formerly ACCBank plc, was originally a commercial bank in Ireland that focused on agriculture and SME lending, and later became a company that focussed on managing the lending facilities of its existing clients. The bank had its origins in the Agricultural Credit Corporation (Corparáid an Chairde Talmhaíochta) set up in 1927 in the Irish Free State to finance agriculture; the bank was successful and led to the creation of the Industrial Credit Company, which was modelled on it and provided finance to industry. In the early 1990s, the company name was changed from "Agricultural Credit Corporation plc" to "ACCBank plc" in order to signify that the company was then targeting more than simply agricultural customers. In early 2002, the bank was sold by the Irish Government to Rabobank, it was one of the three entities of the Rabobank (Ireland).

The bank were the main sponsor of Leinster Rugby from 1992 until the year 2000.

== Company history ==
1927

The Agricultural Credit Corporation was founded in September 1927 and was one of the first creations of the Irish Free State.

1988

A new Agricultural Credit Act empowered the corporation to deploy up to 25% of its risk assets outside agriculture and the foundations of present-day ACCBank were laid.

2000

ACCBank refocused its business model on the SME and Agri sectors positioning the bank as a relationship bank in these sectors.

2002

ACCBank became a wholly owned subsidiary of Rabobank. With the backing of its parent, ACCBank embarking on ambitious plans to strengthen and grow its presence in Ireland as a leading Business and Agri-business bank. As part of the Netherlands-based, former AAA rated, Rabobank Group, ACCBank’s range of products and services included commercial mortgages, working capital finance, asset finance and leasing and wealth management.

2014 - ACCBank Restructuring, ceases banking, debt recovery focus

ACCBank decided to restructure with a focus solely on debt recovery, and stopped delivering banking services on 30 May 2014. This meant the closure of current accounts and return of all deposits, including interest due. All Business Centres in Cork, Drogheda, Dublin, Galway, Kilkenny, Limerick, Mullingar, Sligo and Waterford were closed to the public and the management of loan facilities was centralised instead of being dealt with the local business centres.

ACCBank ceased to be a bank mid-2014 returning its banking licence but continued to manage its loan portfolio. After ACCBank returned its banking licence, it was regulated by the Central Bank of Ireland, but with an alternative status and not as a bank.

Commenting on the changes, country manager Kevin Knightly for parent Rabobank found losses incurred by ACC Bank Plc because of the property crisis, a position emerging of its costs exceeding income during 2014 and that position was unsustainable for its parent, requiring immediate action to stem loses. The bank had reported losses since 2007.

ACC also explored the possibility of outsourcing a portion of its loan book, in the region of 10%, excluding agricultural loans and selected Capita as the preferred service provider who have 1,000 staff in Ireland.

ACC had 5,000 deposit customers totaling €110 million. Overdrafts on current accounts amounted to almost €75m.

The parent company, Rabobank Group, had provided capital support of €1.3 billion to ACC since 2008 with over €2.1 billion of the loan book written down since 2008.

SIPTU and UNITE trade unions wanted the Government to take ACC Bank back into State ownership and were looking for a meeting with the Minister for Finance in an attempt to seek to save jobs. They referred to the inclusion of a State investment bank in the Programme for Government. There was some redeployment opportunities to Rabobank but no new business was being generated for some time with the bank's staff focused on debt recovery.

2018-19: Sale of loans In December 2018, ACCLM transferred the ownership of outstanding loans to the Dutch parent company, which sold the portfolios the following year.

The remaining assets and liabilities of ACCLM, mainly consisting of dormant or unclaimed accounts, were transferred to ACC Investments Limited. ACCIL still operates from a small office in the International Financial Services Centre with a skeleton staff.

== See also ==
- List of Irish companies
- Agricultural Mortgage Corporation
- List of banks in the Republic of Ireland
