= Designated activity company =

Type of company in Ireland

A designated activity company (Irish: Cuideachta Ghníomhaíochta Ainmnithe) or DAC is a form of company in Ireland created by the Companies Act 2014. Like a limited company, designated activity companies have limited liability. Additionally, they may only carry out activities listed in their constitution documents, and so the concept of ultra vires continues to apply to them. Notable DACs include Ryanair and Ulster Bank.
