= Allied Irish Banks =

Irish commercial bank

Allied Irish Banks, p.l.c.

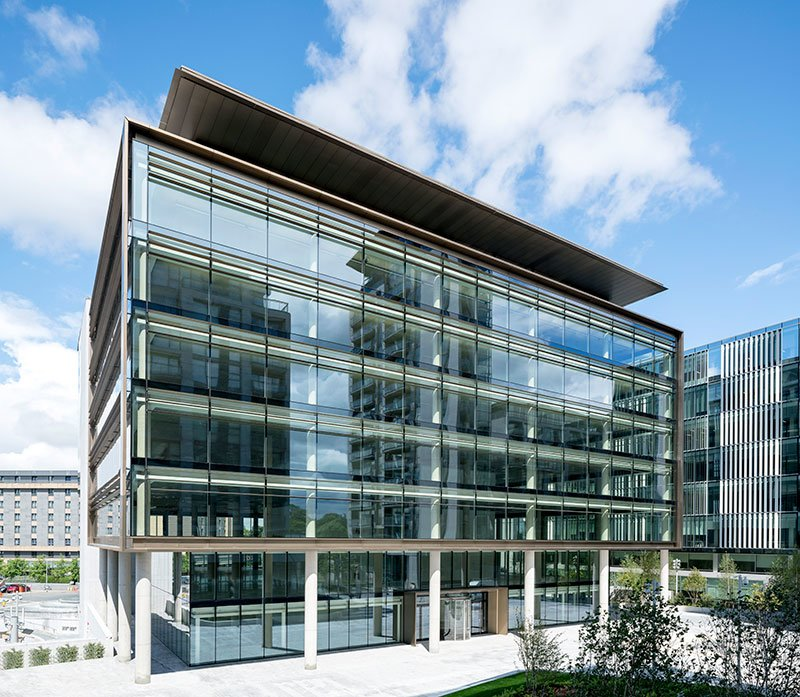
- AIB Office Central Park, Leopardstown, Dublin 18
- Type: Public limited company (p.l.c.)
- Traded as: Euronext Dublin: A5G; ISEQ 20 component
- ISIN: IE00BF0L3536
- Industry: Banking
- Predecessor: Provincial Bank of Ireland; Royal Bank of Ireland
- Founded: 21 September 1966; 60 years ago
- Headquarters: 10 Molesworth Street, Dublin 2, Ireland
- Area served: Ireland; United Kingdom
- Key people: Jim Pettigrew (Chairman); Colin Hunt (CEO)
- Services: Financial services
- Revenue: €4.9 billion (2024)
- Operating income: ▲€4.92 billion (2024)
- Net income: ▲€2.35 billion (2024)
- Total assets: €148.2 billion (2025)
- Number of employees: 10,469 (2024)
- Subsidiaries: AIB Group (UK) plc
- Website: aib.ie

Allied Irish Banks, p.l.c. is one of the so-called Big Four commercial banks in the Republic of Ireland. AIB offers a full range of personal, business and corporate banking services. The bank also offers a range of general insurance products such as home, travel and car. It offers life assurance and pensions through AIB Life.

In December 2010 the Irish government took a majority stake in the bank, which eventually grew to 99.8%. AIB's shares are currently traded on the Irish Stock Exchange and the London Stock Exchange, but its shares were delisted from these exchanges between 2011 and 2017, following its effective nationalisation. The remainder of its publicly traded shares were listed on the Enterprise Securities Market of the Irish Stock Exchange until 23 June 2017.

AIB also owns Allied Irish Bank (GB) in Great Britain and AIB (NI) in Northern Ireland. In November 2010, it sold its 22.5% stake in M&T Bank in the United States. At the beginning of 2008 AIB entered the Latvian, Estonian and Lithuanian markets by acquiring AmCredit mortgage finance business from the Baltic – American Enterprise Fund. This stake was sold at a loss to Swedbank in 2012.

In 2009, Allied Irish Banks along with its competitor Bank of Ireland accepted a €3.5 billion bailout from the government of Ireland as a part of the Bank Recapitalisation Scheme. Over several further tranches, the total bailout of AIB (including EBS) amounted to €20.7 billion.

In June 2017, the Irish government completed an IPO of Allied Irish Banks. In December 2021, when the company was valued less than €6 billion on the public market, the government announced it would start gradually selling its stake. The CEO of AIB since March 2019 is Colin Hunt. Jim Pettigrew was appointed chair of the board in October 2021.

AIB has been designated as a Significant Institution since the entry into force of European Banking Supervision in late 2014, and as a consequence is directly supervised by the European Central Bank.

== Name ==
Allied Irish Banks is usually referred to, both inside and outside the company, simply as AIB and often by its trade name of "Allied Irish Bank" (singular). In Northern Ireland, the bank traded as First Trust Bank until November 2019, while in Great Britain, it is called "Allied Irish Bank (GB)"—the only part of the operation where the full name, in the singular, is still in day-to-day use. Initially, the bank operated under the names of its former constituent companies, alongside a new AIB logo, a circle divided in three with an "A" at the centre. From 1970, these were replaced by "Allied Irish Banks". In 1990, AIB introduced a new logo (prompted, it was said in some quarters, by the remarkable similarity between its previous logo and that of Mercedes-Benz.) Since then, the bank has preferred to be referred to as "AIB", though "Allied Irish Banks plc" remains its legal name.

The bank is often referred to colloquially as "AIB Bank", an example of a redundant acronym. This is due to the name "AIB Bank" being adopted for the Republic of Ireland branch banking business at the time of the 1990 rebrand (with the word "Bank" being printed in the green stripe in the logo). This version of the logo is no longer used in print advertising but can still be seen on the façades of most AIB branches in the Republic. The 'Trustee Savings Banks' similarly rebranded to "TSB Bank" in 1993. The new logo features a depiction of Noah's Ark, after a carving on a Celtic cross at Killary Church near Lobinstown in County Meath, which dates from the 9th century.

== History ==
Allied Irish Banks Limited was formed in 1966 as a new company that acquired three Irish banks: Provincial Bank of Ireland, the Royal Bank of Ireland, and the Munster & Leinster Bank. In 1966, AIB's aggregate assets were IR£255 million (€323.8 million)—as at 31 December 2005, the AIB Group had assets of €133 billion. In the 1980s the introduction of their Automatic Teller Machine Network called Banklink just shortly after the Bank of Ireland Pass. ATMs were only available in cities and major towns in the 1980s but arrived into smaller and medium towns during the 1990s.

=== Early history ===
In 1825, Provincial Bank commenced operations, pioneering joint stock branch banking in Ireland. It also established a branch in London.

The Royal Bank of Ireland (RBI) began operations in 1836 with a capitalisation of £1,500,000, it was floated to take over the business of Shaw's private bank (founded 1797), becoming known for its mercantile links.

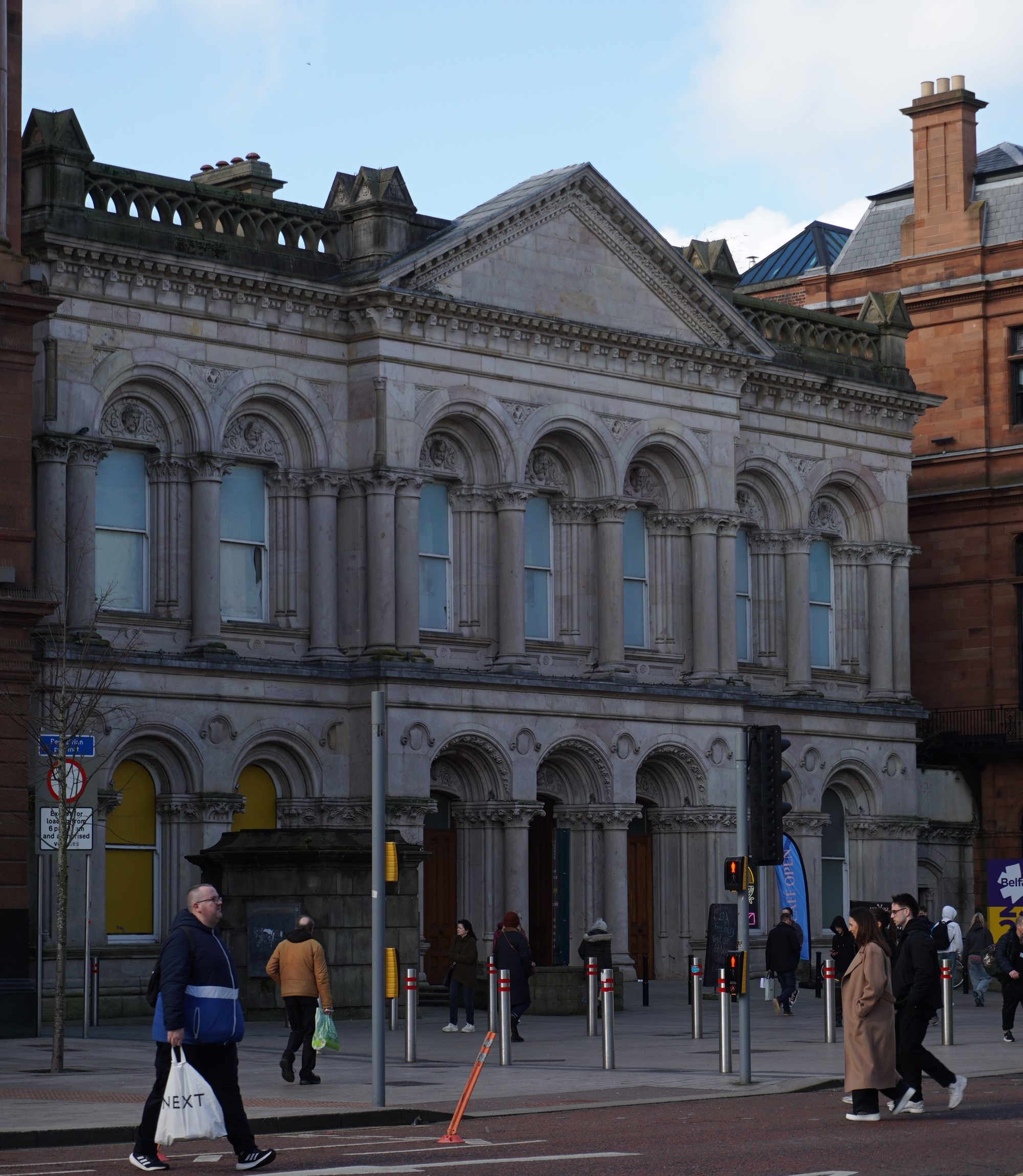
Old Headquarters of the Provincial Bank, Belfast

In 1864, the Munster Bank was established. In 1867, the Munster Bank purchased some of the branches of the unsuccessful Union Bank of Ireland. In 1870, the Munster Bank acquired the David La Touche & Son bank (established 1693). In 1885, the Munster Bank failed due to debt and ran out of cash, causing it to close all of its branches. Also in 1885, the Munster and Leinster Bank commenced operations.

In 1923, the Royal Bank of Ireland bought the Irish Free State business of the Belfast Banking Company, which in turn bought the Northern Ireland business of the Royal Bank.

=== 1985 ICI collapse ===
The Can of Worms at ICI was the headline in Business & Finance magazine on 8 November 1984. The Insurance Corporation of Ireland (ICI) was a wholly owned subsidiary of AIB when it collapsed in 1985 with losses of over IR£200 million. When it was discovered in November 1984 that ICI was operating below the statutory reserve ratio, a request for further capital was made to AIB — ICI had returned a profit of more than £80 million the previous year. This collapse occurred at a time of deep economic recession in Ireland. The level of Government debt at that time was 116% of GDP. But the Irish taxpayer bailed ICI out of its difficulties. The Irish Government did so to ensure a continuation of the insurance business and to protect policyholders. AIB claimed that it could not resolve the problems of ICI without putting its core banking business in jeopardy. The investment of £85 million by AIB in ICI was written off and the cost to the Irish taxpayer was £400 million.

Allied Irish Banks' logo (1990–2016)

Allied Irish Banks' former crest

On 9 September 2010 AIB reached agreement to sell a 66% stake in BZ-WBK to Santander for €3.1 billion, the balance of the shares to be sold on the open market. Any purchase over 66% would have forced Santander to make an offer to buy the entire company.

=== Recent history ===
Between 1999 and 2001 AIB had an interest in Keppel TatLee Bank in Singapore, but withdrew after Oversea-Chinese Banking Corporation (OCBC) acquired it.

After suffering large losses due to the activities of rogue trader John Rusnak at Allfirst (see below) in April 2003, AIB completed a deal merging Allfirst with M&T Bank Corporation, which is headquartered in Buffalo, New York. In November 2010, AIB sold its 22.5% stake (26.7 million shares) in M&T. The shares were sold at US$77.50 per share and generated $2.1 billion. The sale was part of AIB's effort to raise capital amidst the ongoing financial crisis in Ireland. AIB maintains its current US customer treasury services from its branch in New York.

At the beginning of 2008 AIB entered the Latvian, Estonian and Lithuanian markets by acquiring the AmCredit mortgage finance business from the Baltic American Enterprise Fund. Now AIB operates as a branch of this financial group in Estonia and Lithuania (update needed), operations in Latvia have ceased (see below). In 2008 AIB operated through its local branches providing financial services under established AmCredit brand in all three countries. AmCredit operated as a single product mortgage business, but the company is expanding the range of banking products. All AmCredit's mortgage customers automatically became customers of the AIB branch in their country. The goal of AIB is to become a full service customer focused bank in the Baltic region. The branch in Latvia was operating between 26 November 2007 (date of registration) and 20 September 2012 (date of liquidation). Its mortgage portfolio of 800 loans was acquired by Swedbank.

In February 2008, AIB entered into an agreement to acquire a 49.99% interest in Bulgarian American Credit Bank (BACB), a specialist provider of secured finance to small and medium-sized companies in Bulgaria. AIB later sold its stake in BACB to a Bulgarian private-equity fund for a nominal sum in May 2011.

The Irish government received shares of €3.5 billion in AIB in 2009 as part of measures to recapitalise the bank. In April 2010, AIB announced that the Irish government would receive a stake of 16% or 17% in the bank. The Irish State had been due to receive dividends on those shares, but EU regulations state that banks that get State aid cannot make cash payments. This forced AIB to give the government shares instead.

The bank is currently involved in a number of "sale and leaseback" deals with its properties. In 2005 it sold an extension to its Ballsbridge Bankcentre headquarters for €367 million.

In February 2006 the bank announced record pre-tax profits of €1.7 billion, a 23% rise on the previous year and the largest ever for an Irish bank. The majority of the increase came from its Republic of Ireland operations, but with its Capital Markets in Northern Ireland, Great Britain, Poland and American divisions also making significant contributions. This led to criticism from some newspapers, as their profit per customer was some three times that of other European banks. Former Labour Party leader Pat Rabbitte called for more competition in the Irish banking sector. In August 2006 the bank again announced record profits for the first half of 2006, making €1.2 billion before tax, equating to €1.2 million per hour.

=== 2008 share price collapse ===
The international credit crunch presented the first challenge to AIB — namely a dramatic fall-off in liquidity. As AIB depended to a significant extent on the international financial markets for liquidity due to an insufficient deposit base, this impacted the bank severely. The Irish government stepped in with a guarantee which effectively granted a triple A rating on AIB debt, thus freeing up its access to finance.

The second and more serious problem, unacknowledged by bank management, the financial regulator and the Irish government, is solvency. The question concerning solvency has arisen due to domestic problems in the crashing Irish property market. AIB, like most Irish financial institutions, has substantial exposure to property developers in their loan portfolio. These property developers are currently suffering from gross over-supply of property, much still unsold, while demand has evaporated. The massive immigration from Eastern Europe which had propped up demand has now reversed due to rapidly rising unemployment in Ireland. Irish property developers own speculated billions of euros of overvalued land parcels such as urban brownfield and greenfield sites, and also agricultural land at an average value of €23,600 per acre (US$32,000 per acre or €60,000 per hectare) which is several multiples above the value of equivalent land in other European countries.

AIB correctly identify a systematic risk of triggering an even more severe financial crisis in Ireland if they were to call in the loans as they fall due. The loans are subject to terms and conditions, referred to as "covenants". Although AIB is not one of the banks listed as waiving these covenants, confidence in the Irish banking system is low as a result of other Irish banks electing to waive these financial safeguards in fear of provoking the (inevitable) bankruptcy of many property developers and banks are thought to be "lending some developers further cash to pay their interest bills, which means that they are not classified as 'bad debts' by the banks."

Furthermore, AIB's balance sheet indicated only limited impairment (bad debt) provisions. Their 2008 1st half financial report only accounts for an impairment provision of 0.21%. This does not appear to be consistent with the real negative changes taking place in property market fundamentals. The Central Bank told the Oireachtas Enterprise Committee that shareholders who lost their money in the banking collapse are to blame for their fate and got what was coming to them for not keeping bank chiefs in check, but did admit that the Central Bank had failed to give sufficient warning about reckless lending to property developers.

In contrast, on 7 October 2008, Danske Bank wrote off a substantial sum largely due to property-related losses incurred by its Irish subsidiary, National Irish Bank. Write downs by the domestically owned Irish banks are only now beginning to take place.

AIB's subsidiary Goodbody Stockbrokers continually issued "buy" recommendations for its then parent, notwithstanding its worsening financial position, and used Client Discretionary mandates to invest their monies in Allied Irish Banks at the start of the post-2008 Irish banking crisis in November 2008, which generated adverse comment. When asked if they had ever issued a sell notice on AIB, a Goodbody spokesman said "I don't know if we even keep records going back that far".

=== Rescue package 2009 ===
On 12 February 2009 the Irish government arranged a €7 billion rescue plan for AIB and Bank of Ireland. The bank's capital value had fallen to €486 million, rather less than its 70% holding in Bank Zachodni in Poland.

Goodbody Stockbrokers was sold as part of the restructuring plan for €24 million. The Financial Times commented that the lowly price tag placed on Ireland's oldest stockbroker and "one-time bastion of Ireland's Protestant business elite" was just another measure of the dramatic decline of the Irish economy. AIB were likely to have had to indemnify the new owners of Goodbody Stockbrokers against any legal action arising from the firm's boom-time trading.

=== 2010: Nationalisation ===
On 30 September 2010, the Irish Government announced plans to use its National Pensions Reserve to inject €3.7 billion of capital into Allied Irish Banks, becoming the majority shareholder and effectively nationalizing the bank.

AIB needed to raise additional capital due to increasing losses on bad loans incurred from the real estate bubble, and Irish Finance Minister Brian Lenihan stated that the bank was unable to attract sufficient interest from private investors. As part of the deal, Chairman Dan O'Connor agreed to quit the bank while managing director, Colm Doherty, announced he would leave before the end of the year after 13 months in the job.

In December 2010, the European Commission approved the plans, and the Government passed emergency legislation to allow the deal to take place without requiring the approval of existing shareholders. The High Court subsequently approved the deal on 24 December 2010, allowing the Irish government to take a 49.9% stake in the bank, rising to 92.8% following disposal of the Polish subsidiary to Banco Santander.

AIB became the fourth of Ireland's "Big Six" financial institutions to be nationalised, following Anglo Irish Bank, Irish Nationwide Building Society, and EBS Building Society. AIB was delisted from the main market of the Irish Stock Exchange on 25 January 2011 and the NYSE on 26 August 2011.

=== 2011 AIB filed lawsuit ===
AIB filed a lawsuit against Oracle Financial Services, India in January 2011, claiming breach of contract on Flexcube implementation. The case was settled later that year.

=== 2020 Workforce reduction ===
In December 2020 AIB announced its intention to cut 1,500 jobs by 2023 noting that due to the COVID-19 pandemic, 80% of its workforce had been working from home. Some branches were also merged.

=== Re-privatisation ===
The former Minister for Finance Pascal Donohoe said that the government would be selling its then 71% stake in the bank, with the sell-off beginning in January 2022.

In June 2024, it was announced that the government's ownership had reduced to 25% as part of a share sale at the time.

In March 2025, the Irish Government announced its plans to reduce its stake in AIB Group from 12% to around 3% after approving the bank's €1.2 billion share buyback plan. The move continued Ireland's gradual exit from the bank, which it nationalised in 2010 with a €21 billion bailout. In June 2025, the Irish Government sold its remaining stake in AIB, thus returning the bank to full private ownership.

== Controversy ==
=== 2002: John Rusnak losses ===
John Rusnak, a currency trader at Allfirst, racked up losses of almost US$700 million during Michael Buckley's tenure as group chief executive. It was Ireland's biggest banking scandal and the fourth-biggest banking scandal in the world when it came to light on 4 February 2002.

=== Tax evasion ===
The €90 million settlement that AIB reached with the Revenue Commissioners in respect of Deposit Interest Retention Tax evasion in 2000 was the highest tax settlement in the history of Ireland. The bank's internal auditor, Tony Spollen, highlighted a potential Deposit Interest Retention Tax (DIRT) liability of IR£100 million for the period 1986–1991, but Gerry Scanlon, the group chief executive at that time rubbished this estimate, describing it as "infantile". The Oireachtas Sub-Committee Inquiry into DIRT hearing on 27 September 1999 concluded that it was "extraordinary" when Scanlon told the Inquiry that he was unaware of the scale of the DIRT issue.

The Revenue Commissioners on 28 March 2006 imposed a tax settlement plus penalties on four former senior executives for their interest, while employed by AIB, arising from investments they maintained in Faldor Limited. Faldor was an investment company set up in the British Virgin Islands that between 1989 and 1996 hold funds on behalf of these senior AIB executives as well as people connected to them. Allied Irish Banks Investment Managers then managed the funds in the company on their behalf; at the time Gerry Scanlan was CEO of the bank. Faldor subsequently benefited from inappropriate deal allocations, and artificial deals that amounted to €48,000 out of AIB Investment Managers' own funds.

Those cited include:

- Gerry Scanlon, chief executive AIB Group when this arrangement was in place, of Glenageary, County Dublin; tax and penalties amounted to €206,010.
- Diarmuid Moore, former director of corporate strategy at AIB, Malahide, County Dublin; tax and penalties amounted to €51,044.
- Roy Douglas, chairman, Irish Life & Permanent Plc and formerly of AIB, Howth, County Dublin; tax and penalties amounting to €53,245.43 was secured.
- Patrick Dowling, former deputy chief executive, late of Delgany, County Wicklow; the estate paid tax and penalties of €13,000.

=== Excess FX charging issues ===
In 2004 it was revealed that the bank had been overcharging on foreign exchange transactions for up to ten years. The overcharging affected 3 million purchase transactions of foreign drafts. Initially the projected amount of overcharging was €14 million. However the bank set aside €50 million to cover the cost of refunds.

The Central Bank of Ireland published a report into an investigation of AIB Group concerning overcharging its own customers for FX transactions and deal allocation and other associated issues. This revealed excess charges of €34.2 million, including interest. AIB failed to comply with the law for a period of almost 8 years and that certain staff and management were fully aware of this at the time.

The Central Bank of Ireland had been aware that AIB was overcharging consumers in FX fees but did not act for a number of years. They gave a parliamentary inquiry the "false impression" that they were unaware of it. The whistleblower who gave the Central Bank the information was requested to come to a meeting with them but was only invited to withdraw the allegations of wrongdoing and at the same time found himself removed from his position at AIB without any reason given. After his case was highlighted in the media, the Central Bank officially apologised on how the authorities treated him, eight years after alerting them of overcharging.

AIB announced on 27 September 2006 that the final outlay in respect of restitution and interest arising from overcharging amounted to €65 million and that this included a donation of €20.6 million on behalf of its customers to an unspecified charity that it was unable to identify. No employee or officer of the banks was disciplined.

Apart from FX, the Central Bank of Ireland discovered in 2004, following an anonymous tip-off, that AIB overcharged customers €8.6 million. No regulatory action was taken.

=== Deal allocation and associated issues ===
Between 1989 and 1996, funds of certain senior executives of AIB at the time and/or related parties were managed by Allied Irish Investment Managers Limited (now AIBIM) through a British Virgin Islands investment company, Faldor Ltd.

Faldor benefited from inappropriate favorable deal allocations, by way of artificial deals, amounting to approximately IR£38,000 (€48,000) out of AIBIM's own funds. Further inappropriate deal allocation practices relating to eight transactions in the period 1991 to 1993 were identified which adversely affected the performance of two specialist unit trusts, amounting to a total of £137,000 (€174,000), to the advantage of other clients. These were unrelated to Faldor. While the Internal Audit function of AIB did identify some inappropriate dealing practices in 1991 and 1993, there is no evidence that the Faldor account was identified in these audits. No disciplinary action was taken against individuals involved in these practices at the time and compensation was not paid to the unit trusts affected. When this episode of law breaking was exposed a disciplinary process was put in place within AIB and compensation has been paid to those who were disadvantaged. Tom Mulcahy, group chief executive of AIB from 1994 to June 2001, resigned the chairmanship of the board of Aer Lingus on 28 May 2004 following the disclosure of this matter.

=== Charles Haughey and the Moriarty Tribunal ===
In 2006, the Moriarty Tribunal published its report into the financial affairs of former Taoiseach Charles Haughey. Justice Moriarty found that AIB had settled a IR£1 million (€1.27 million) overdraft with Haughey on favourable terms for the politician shortly after he became Taoiseach in 1979; the tribunal found that the leniency shown by the bank in this case amounted to a benefit from the bank to Haughey. According to the report, the bank showed an extraordinary degree of deference to Haughey despite his financial excesses.

=== Cashless branches ===
On 19 July 2022, AIB announced that 70 of its 170 branches would become cashless due to "declining demand for these services" by October 2022. Under the plans, these branches would no longer provide cash or cheque services and ATMs would also be removed. The announcement was heavily criticised by GAA clubs, local councillors and AIB customers in rural areas. On 21 July, Government TDs sought an emergency meeting with Minister for Finance Paschal Donohoe regarding the move. Taoiseach Micheál Martin said AIB should "reconsider and reflect on" its decision to remove cash facilities at 70 branches around the country.

The next day, on 22 July, the Minister for Social Protection, Rural and Community Development, Heather Humphreys called on AIB to halt the decision to go cashless at 70 branches, stating that rural communities across the country were "rightly angry" about the plan, accusing the bank of showing a "complete disregard" for rural communities. In the afternoon, AIB announced that it would not be proceeding with its plan to end cash services at 70 branches around the country following a backlash to the move from business groups, consumers, farming and rural organisations and politicians.

== Subsidiaries ==
AIB Group (UK) p.l.c. is registered in Northern Ireland. Regulated by the Financial Services Authority, it serves as the legal entity for the United Kingdom banking division of the group. It trades under:

1. Allied Irish Bank (GB) in Great Britain, where it is primarily a business bank.
2. AIB (NI) in Northern Ireland, where it offers a full range of banking services, both to business and residential customers.

=== Allied Irish Bank (GB) ===
Allied Irish Bank (GB) can trace its history back to the year of 1825. It was located in London. It now operates across Great Britain in 21 various locations. The bank also employs about 700 people, offering business banking services, delivered online and through 21 branches in Great Britain. The bank is authorised by the Prudential Regulation Authority and regulated by both the Financial Conduct Authority and the Prudential Regulation Authority. It is covered by the Financial Services Compensation Scheme.

Allied Irish Bank (GB) has had the following successes and awards:

- 2014, 2015 and 2016 : Best Service from a Business Bank at Business Moneyfacts Awards
- 2012 and 2013 : Winner of Best Business Fixed Account provider at Business Moneyfacts Awards
- 2013 : Moneyfacts Awards Finalist in three categories: Business Bank of the Year
- 2013 : Best Business Card Provider

== Sponsorships ==
During the late 1990s and early 2000s there were AIB Better Ireland Awards shown on RTE television.

AIB were one of the key sponsors of the 2006 Ryder Cup, which was held at The K Club in Straffan, County Kildare. In May of that year, the bank launched a €5 million advertising campaign for the tournament. AIB also sponsor an MSc course in Data Science at Technological University Dublin for a select few of their employees.

== See also ==
- AIB UK
- Inter-Alpha Group of Banks
- List of banks in the euro area
- List of banks in the Republic of Ireland
