= Danske Bank (Ireland) =

Irish bank

- Type: Subsidiary of Danske Bank
- Founded: Dublin, Ireland (1986)
- Headquarters: Dublin, Ireland
- Key people: Thomas F. Borgen (Chairman of Executive Board); Terry Browne (Country Head, Republic of Ireland)
- Products: Financial services
- Number of employees: 366 (2012)
- Parent: Danske Bank
- Website: danskeci.com/ie

National Irish bank logo

Danske Bank, formerly known as the National Irish Bank, is a bank operating in the Republic of Ireland. The bank is a subsidiary of the Danske Bank Group which is headquartered in Copenhagen.

Danske Bank is organised in three business units – Personal Banking, Business Banking and Corporates & Institutions – that span all of the Group's geographical markets. Since November 2012, all of the Group's banking activities have been gathered under the Danske Bank brand name. The group's websites were brought fully into alignment with the new organisation at the same time.

== History ==
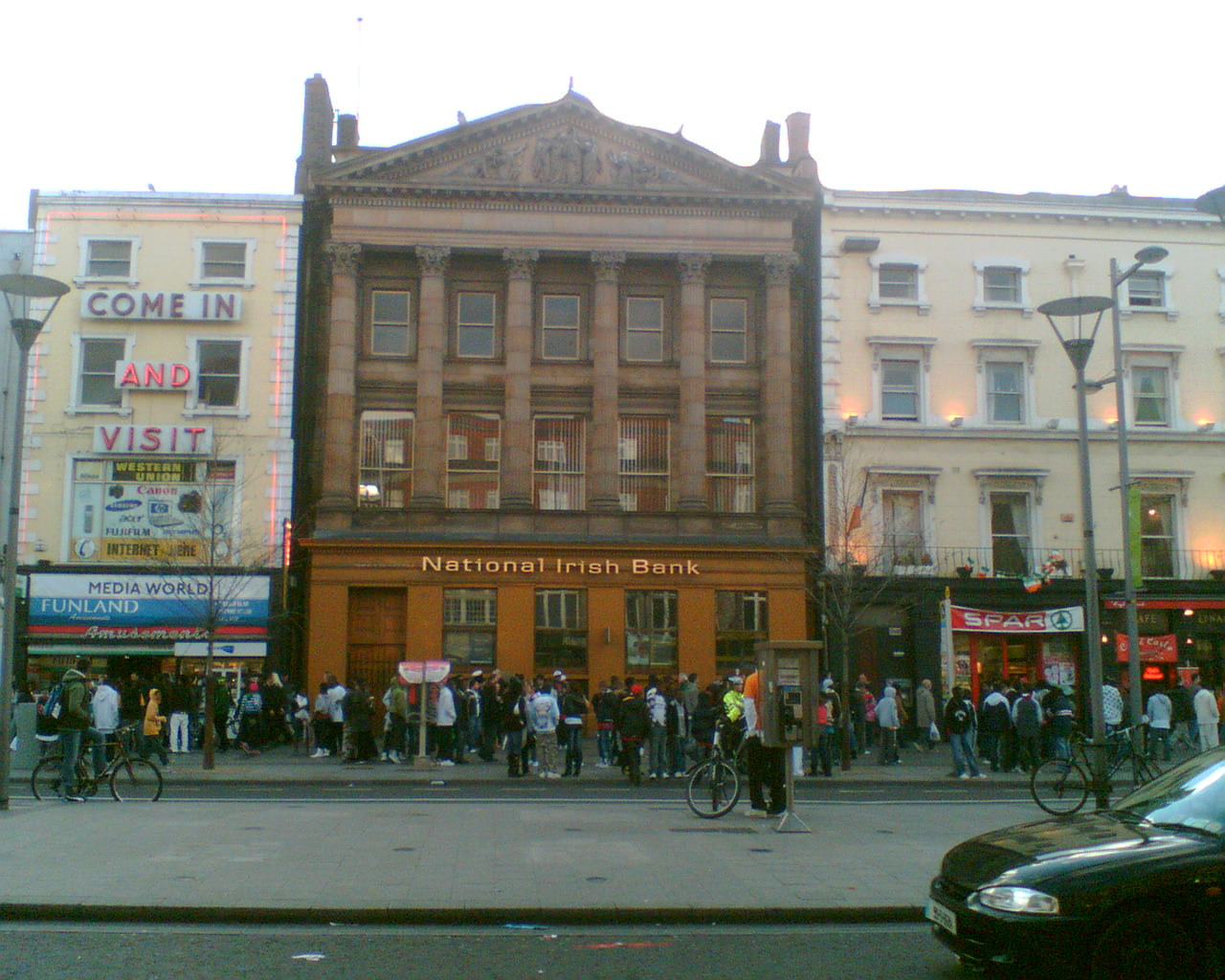
Former National Irish Bank branch on O'Connell Street in Dublin. The pediment, by John Steell, depicts the Parable of the Wise and Foolish Virgins.

National Irish Bank was originally the Republic of Ireland branch network of Northern Bank, one of the oldest banks in Ireland, having been founded as a private partnership in 1809, converting to a joint stock entity in 1824. National Irish Bank was created as a separate entity in 1986, at first under the name Northern Bank (Ireland) Limited, when its owners, UK-based Midland Bank, separated Northern Bank's operations in the Republic of Ireland from its Northern Ireland business.

In 1987, both banks were acquired by National Australia Bank (along with Midland Bank's Scottish subsidiary, Clydesdale Bank). In 1988 the Republic of Ireland operation was renamed National Irish Bank Limited whilst Northern Bank Limited remained the name of the Northern Ireland operation. Nonetheless, a single management team continued to run both banks, which shared many services and back office functions. During this era, the logo of the National Irish Bank was that of the National Australia Bank (at the time), except that the red star had been recoloured green, and "Irish Bank" was added alongside the word "National". The original Northern Bank (Ireland) logo had been the Midland Bank griffin device.

=== Lacey era: 1988–1994 ===
In 1988, Jim Lacey was appointed CEO of NIB. He was briefed to spearhead a campaign to raise the bank’s profile, which included innovations such as lower interest rates. Lacey commissioned a high-profile advertising campaign, featuring fictitious NIB manager Martin, who would repeatedly call his cousin Niall about the great deals the bank was offering.

In 1993, Irish crime lord Martin Cahill planned a raid on NIB, using then CEO Jim Lacey and his family as hostages to extract up to €10 million in cash. In early 1993 John "The Coach" Traynor met with his boss Cahill to provide him with inside information about the inner-workings of NIB at College Green, Dublin. Traynor told Cahill that the bank regularly held more than €10 million in cash in the building. The plan was to abduct Lacey, his wife and four children and take them to an isolated hiding place. There they would be held with fellow gang member, but acting as a "hostage" Jo Jo Kavanagh, who would frighten Lacey into handing over every penny stored in the bank's vaults.

On 1 November 1993, Cahill's gang that included Brian Meehan seized Lacey and his wife outside his home in Blackrock. Holding them at Lacey's home, Kavanagh was brought in and tied up, telling the family that he had been abducted two weeks before. On 2 November, Kavanagh drove Lacey to College Green to collect the ransom money, with Lacey eventually withdrawing IR£300,000 from an accessible cash machine. Kavanagh then drove the pair and the money to the local Garda station, where he told them the pair had been kidnapped and forced to take part in a robbery.

With a ransom note requesting payment of €10 million in cash, the Gardaí began investigating. They quickly found that Kavanagh had claimed child allowance during his two-week "capture," and so arrested him. Cahill then planned with Kavanagh to "raid" Kavanagh's home, and show intent to kill the Lacey family by shooting Kavanagh in the leg. Kavanagh was then to call the Irish newspapers from his hospital bed, and claim he was a victim of the Lacey kidnapping gang.

However, the plan failed, and the gang were arrested. Released on bail, in 1994, Cahill was murdered by a claimed Irish Republican Army hitman close to his home in Rathmines, who had been paid for by rival drug gang crime lord and former Cahill gang member John Gilligan. In 1997, Kavanagh was jailed for 12 years for offences connected with the Lacey kidnapping.

=== 1998 Inspection ===
Dismissed by National Australia Bank in 1994, Lacey was subsequently appointed CEO of publishers Lafferty, and also appointed chairman of the Irish Aviation Authority and the Dublin Docklands Development Authority. However, he resigned these positions in 1998 after a report on RTÉ was further investigated by High Court of the Republic of Ireland. After subsequently appointing inspectors in Dublin, Their report conclusions were:

- Bogus non-resident accounts in some branches enabled customers to evade tax
- Investment policies were promoted for funds undisclosed to the Revenue Commissioners
- Special Savings Accounts had Deposit Interest Retention Tax (DIRT) deducted at a reduced rate. Note: this point may be incorrect as the legal SSA product was designed to have DIRT deducted at a lower rate. Budget legislation over the past number of years has brought the reduced DIRT rate up and the standard DIRT down to a point where they both currently meet i.e.: 20%.
- There was improper charging of interest or fees to some customers. (The bank has refunded all customers who the Inspectors alleged had been mischarged.)

Following the Inspectors' report, the Director of Corporate Enforcement took disqualification proceedings against nine former NIB personnel, none of whom has been employed by NIB since the 1990s.

== Changes under Danske ==
On 1 March 2005, Danske formally took control of National Irish Bank. It announced as its first act that the Northern Bank and National Irish Bank would be fully separated from each other, with a new management team appointed to National Irish Bank. The bank changed over to the Danske Bank technology platform.

The bank adopted the logo of Danske Bank, albeit with the word "Danske" replaced by "National Irish". The bank was formally relaunched on 18 April, with a new product offering, and a revamped internet banking system. Among the innovations is the use of text messages to communicate with customers.

In June 2005, Andrew Healy was appointed as the CEO of the National Irish Bank.

In January 2007, Danske Bank announced that the banking business of National Irish Bank Limited would be transferred to Danske Bank A/S, Irish Branch. The practical effect of this was that from 1 April 2007 National Irish Bank was no longer regulated by the Central Bank of Ireland but by the Danish Financial Services Authority, as NIB was now to be a division of Danske Bank rather than a separate subsidiary.

In December 2009, National Irish Bank announced that it was launching a restructuring programme, this would involve closing 25 of its branches and also changing its banking model.

Beginning in early 2010, National Irish Bank began moving away from a 'Cash Bank' to 'Cashless'. The first of these branches to go cashless were Malahide and Dun Laoghaire branches. By the middle of 2011 National Irish Bank became a completely cashless bank and no longer accepts cash for lodgments. The bank announced that they would be looking at possible third parties to accept cash lodgments.

Further on from the announcement that National Irish Bank would be moving towards a cash-free operation, An Post was announced as the third party who will accept lodgments on behalf of NIB. This came into effect from 1 November. It meant that all National Irish Bank customers will be able to lodge cash they may have in any An Post office around the country, currently there are over 1,200 An Post branches in ROI.

=== Reintegration with Northern Bank and rebrand ===
On 10 May 2012, Danske Bank announced that Northern Bank and National Irish Bank would be reintegrated on 1 June 2012, under the Northern Bank management team and the Danske Bank name, effectively reversing the separation between the two. The rebrand was completed on 18 November 2012. At the time the bank closed its 27 branches to focus on corporate and private clients, subsequently pulling out of the Irish personal/retail banking market completely.

== Tiger robbery, August 2006 ==
The Killester, Dublin branch (known as Howth Road branch) of National Irish Bank was the scene of a 'tiger robbery' on 29 August 2006 when a 23-year-old employee was kidnapped by an armed gang. The bank handed over a ransom of €270,000 without informing or involving the Garda Síochána. The Garda Síochána heavily criticised this action, stating that it leaves the bank exposed in the future to replica attacks.

== Closure of personal banking ==
On 31 October 2013 Danske Bank announced it would be withdrawing all personal banking services in the Republic of Ireland on a phased basis in the first half of 2014.

== See also ==
- List of companies of Ireland
- List of banks in the Republic of Ireland
