= Great Compression =

Early 1940s wage compression in the United States

The Great Compression refers to the period of substantial wage compression in the United States that began in the early 1940s. During that time, economic inequality as shown by wealth distribution and income distribution between the rich and poor became much smaller than it had been in preceding time periods. The term was reportedly coined by Claudia Goldin and Robert Margo in a 1992 paper, and is a takeoff on the Great Depression, an event during which the Great Compression started.

According to economists Thomas Piketty and Emmanuel Saez, analysis of personal income tax data shows that the compression ended in the 1970s and has now reversed in the United States, and to a lesser extent in Canada, and England where there is greater income inequality metrics and wealth concentration. In France and Japan, who have maintained progressive taxation there has not been an increase in inequality. In Switzerland, where progressive taxation was never implemented, compression never occurred.

Economist Paul Krugman gives credit for the compression not only to progressive income taxation but to other New Deal and World War II policies of President Franklin D. Roosevelt. From about 1937 to 1947 highly progressive taxation, the strengthening of unions of the New Deal, and the wage and price controls of the National War Labor Board during World War II, raised the income of the poor and working class and lowered that of top earners. Krugman argues these explanations are more convincing than the conventional Kuznets curve cycle of inequality driven by market forces because a natural change would have been gradual and not sudden as the compression was.

Explanations for the length of the compression have been attributed to the lack of immigrant labor in the US during that time (immigrants often not being able to vote and so support their political interests) and the strength of unions, exemplified by Reuther's Treaty of Detroit—a landmark 1949 business-labor bargain struck between the United Auto Workers union and General Motors. Under that agreement, UAW members were guaranteed wages that rose with productivity, as well as health and retirement benefits. In return GM had relatively few strikes, slowdowns, etc. Unions helped limit increases in executive pay. Further, members of Congress in both political parties significantly overlapped in their voting records and relatively more politicians advocated centrist positions with a general acceptance of New Deal policies.

The end of income compression has been credited to "impersonal forces", such as technological change and globalization, but also to political and policy changes that affected institutions (e.g., unions) and norms (e.g., acceptable executive pay). Krugman argues that the rise of "movement conservatism"—a "highly cohesive set of interlocking institutions that brought Ronald Reagan and Newt Gingrich to power"—beginning in the late 1970s and early 1980s brought lower taxes on the rich and significant holes in the social safety net. The relative power of unions declined significantly along with union membership, and executive pay rose considerably relative to average worker pay. The reversal of the great compression has been called "the Great Divergence" by Krugman and is the title of a Slate article and book by Timothy Noah.

== See also ==
- Income inequality in the United States
- Economic history of the United States
