= Income inequality in the United States =

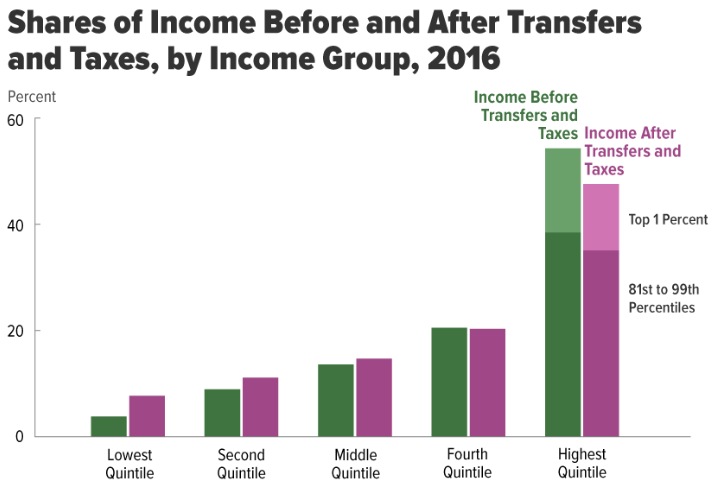
Income before (green) and after (pink) taxes and transfer payments for different income groups starting with the lowest quintile

Income inequality has fluctuated considerably in the United States since measurements began around 1915, moving in an arc between peaks in the 1920s and 2000s, with a lower level of inequality from approximately 1950-1980 (a period named the Great Compression), followed by increasing inequality, in what has been coined as the great divergence.

The U.S. has the highest level of income inequality among its (post-industrialized) peers. When measured for all households, U.S. income inequality is comparable to other developed countries before taxes and transfers, but is among the highest after taxes and transfers, meaning the U.S. shifts relatively less income from higher income households to lower income households. In 2016, average market income was $15,600 for the lowest quintile and $280,300 for the highest quintile. The degree of inequality accelerated within the top quintile, with the top 1% at $1.8 million, approximately 30 times the $59,300 income of the middle quintile.

The economic and political impacts of inequality may include slower GDP growth, reduced income mobility, higher poverty rates, greater use of household debt, leading to an increased risk of financial crises, and political polarization. Causes of inequality may include executive compensation increasing relative to the average worker, financialization, greater industry concentration, lower unionization rates, lower effective tax rates on higher incomes, and technology changes that reward higher educational attainment.

Measurement is debated, as inequality measures vary significantly, for example, across datasets or whether the measurement is taken based on cash compensation (market income) or after taxes and transfer payments. The Gini coefficient is a widely accepted statistic that allows comparisons across jurisdictions, with 0 indicating perfect equality and 1 indicating maximum inequality. Further, various public and private data sets measure those incomes, e.g., from the Congressional Budget Office (CBO), the Internal Revenue Service, and Census. According to the Census Bureau, income inequality reached then record levels in 2018, with a Gini of 0.485, Since then the Census Bureau have given values of 0.488 in 2020 and 0.494 in 2021, per pre-tax money income. For 2025, the Census Bureau reported a Gini index of 0.490 for pretax money income, a change from 2024 that was not statistically significant.

U.S. tax and transfer policies are progressive and therefore reduce effective income inequality, as rates of tax generally increase as taxable income increases. As a group, the lowest earning workers, especially those with dependents, pay no income taxes and may actually receive a small subsidy from the federal government (from child credits and the Earned Income Tax Credit). The 2016 U.S. Gini coefficient was .59 based on market income; it was reduced to .42 after taxes and transfers, according to Congressional Budget Office (CBO) figures. The top 1% share of market income rose from 9.6% in 1979 to a peak of 20.7% in 2007, before falling to 17.5% by 2016. After taxes and transfers, these figures were 7.4%, 16.6%, and 12.5%, respectively.

== Definitions ==
Income growth since 1970

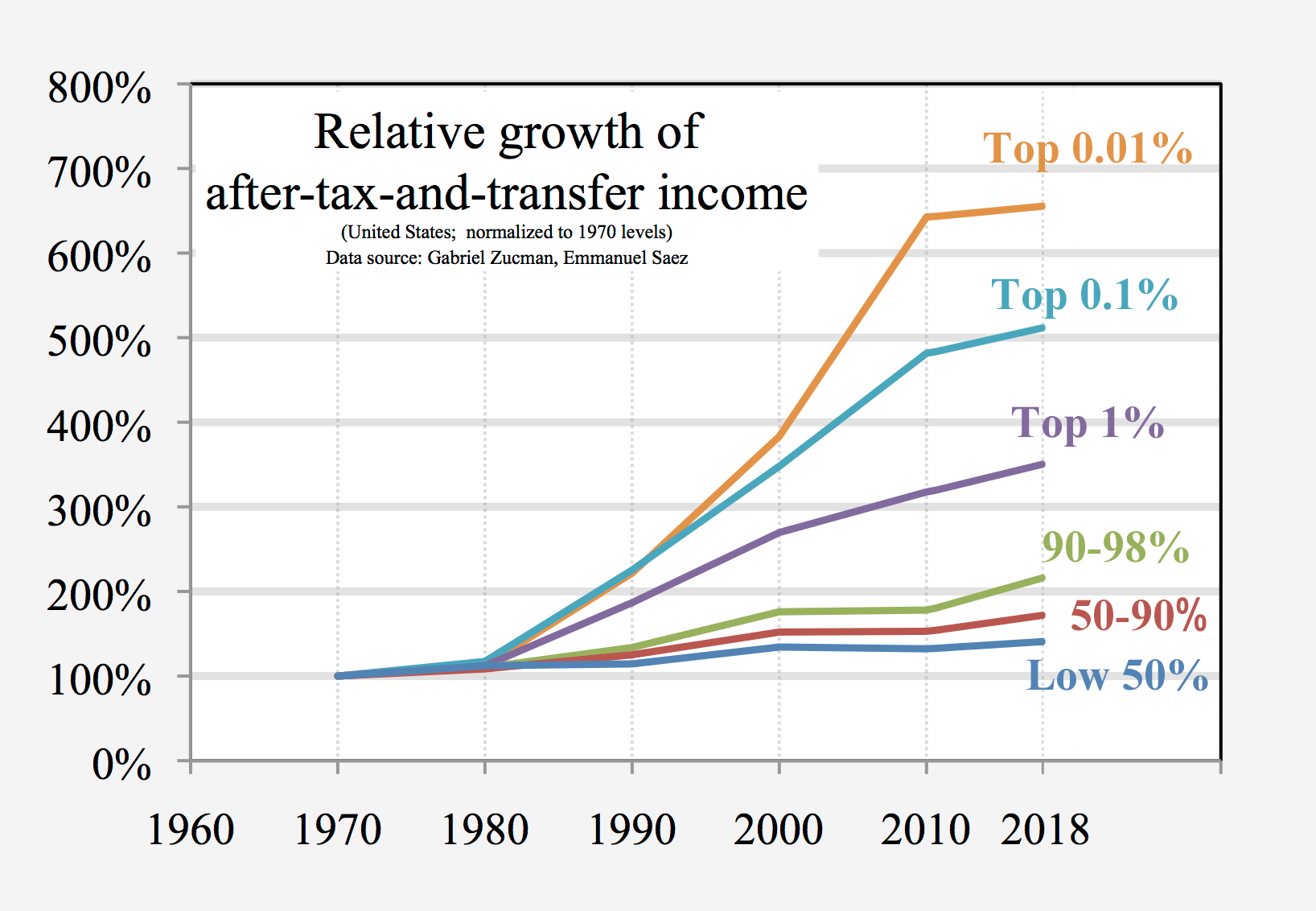
Relative income growth, organized by percentile classes, normalized to 1970 levels. Graph accounts for both income growth, and the hidden decline in the progressivity of the tax code at the top, the wealthiest earners having seen their effective tax rates steadily fall.

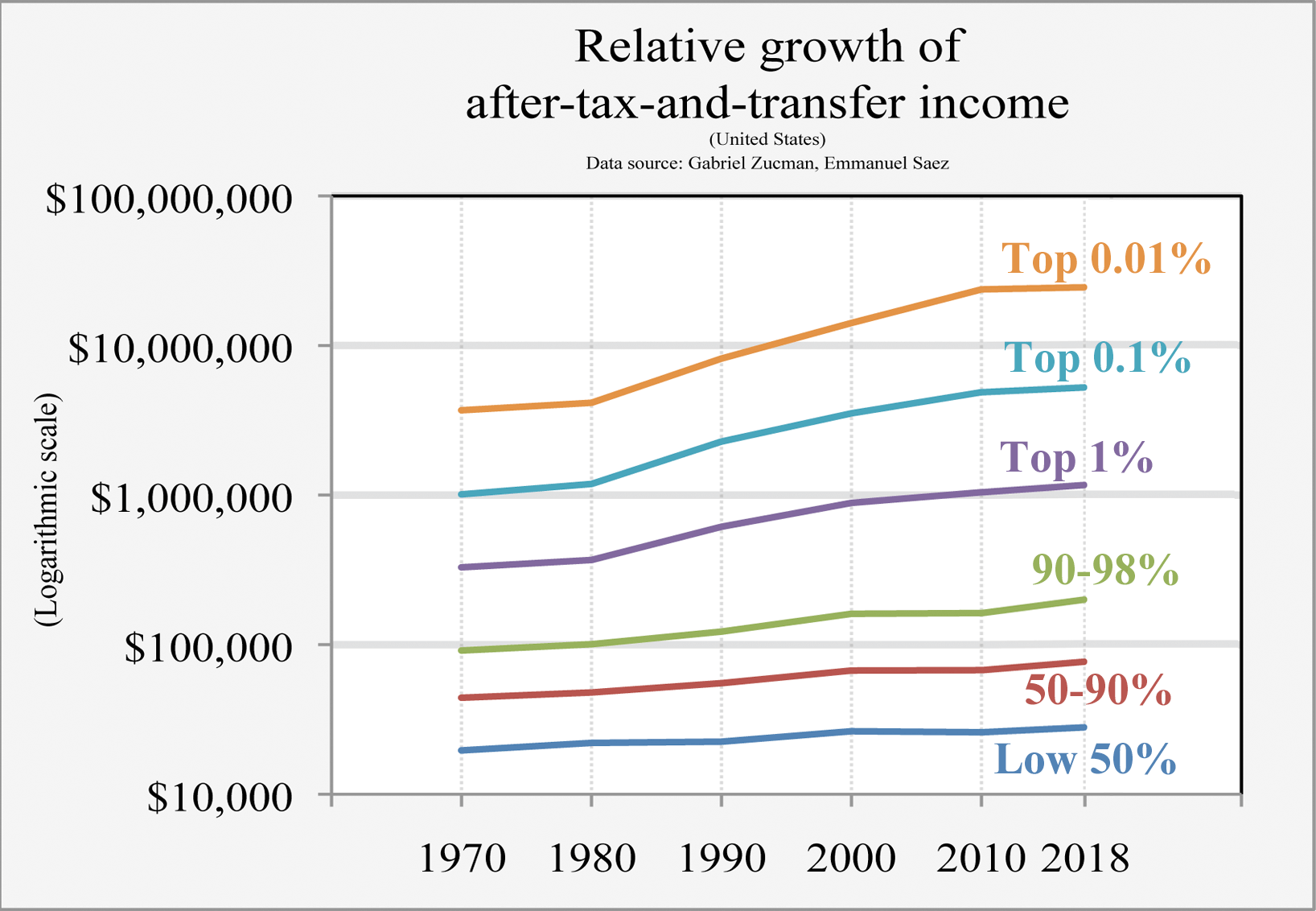
Same data as adjacent chart, but plotted on logarithmic scale to show absolute dollar amounts. Data span three orders of magnitude—a ~1000-fold difference.

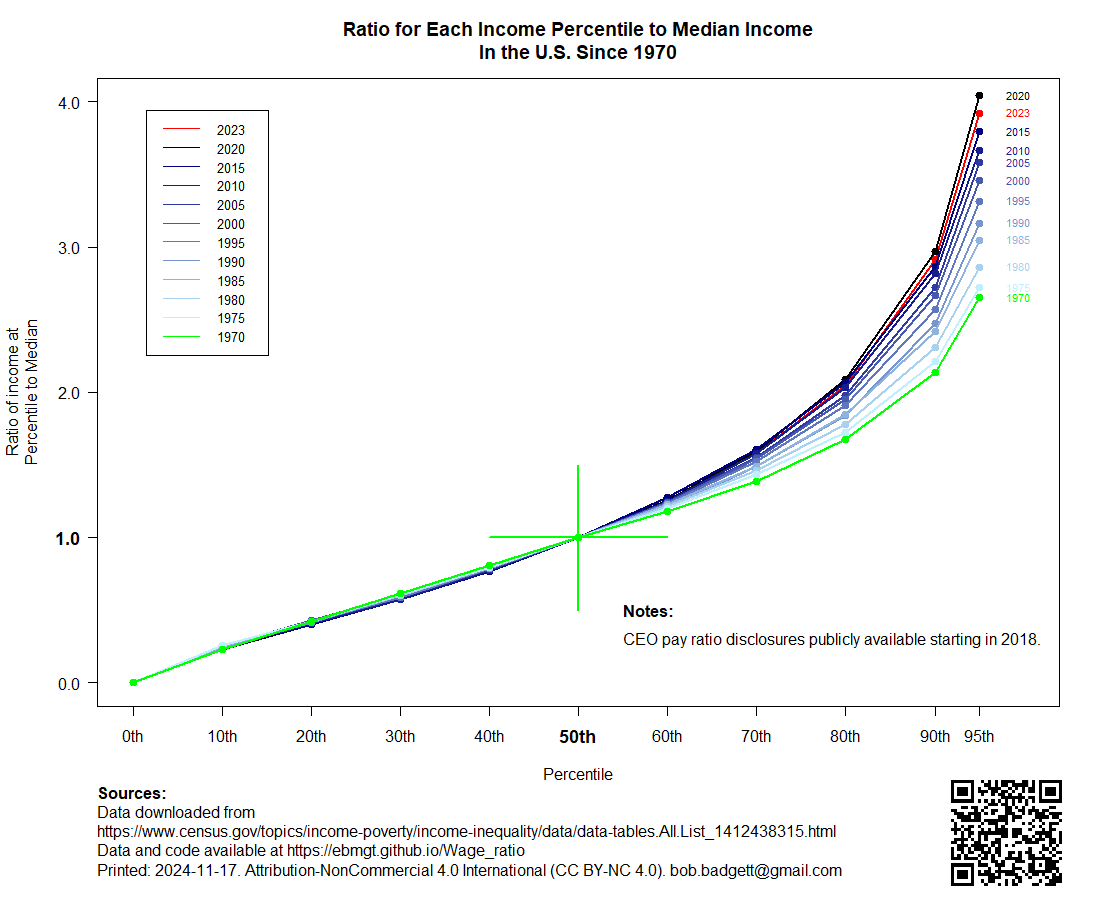
Ratio for Each Income Percentile to Median Income in the U.S. since 1970. The plot shows the increase in the relative gains of those above the median versus those below the median, with the largest gains for those in the highest percentile. Finally, in 2023, the steepness of the curve decreased (red line).

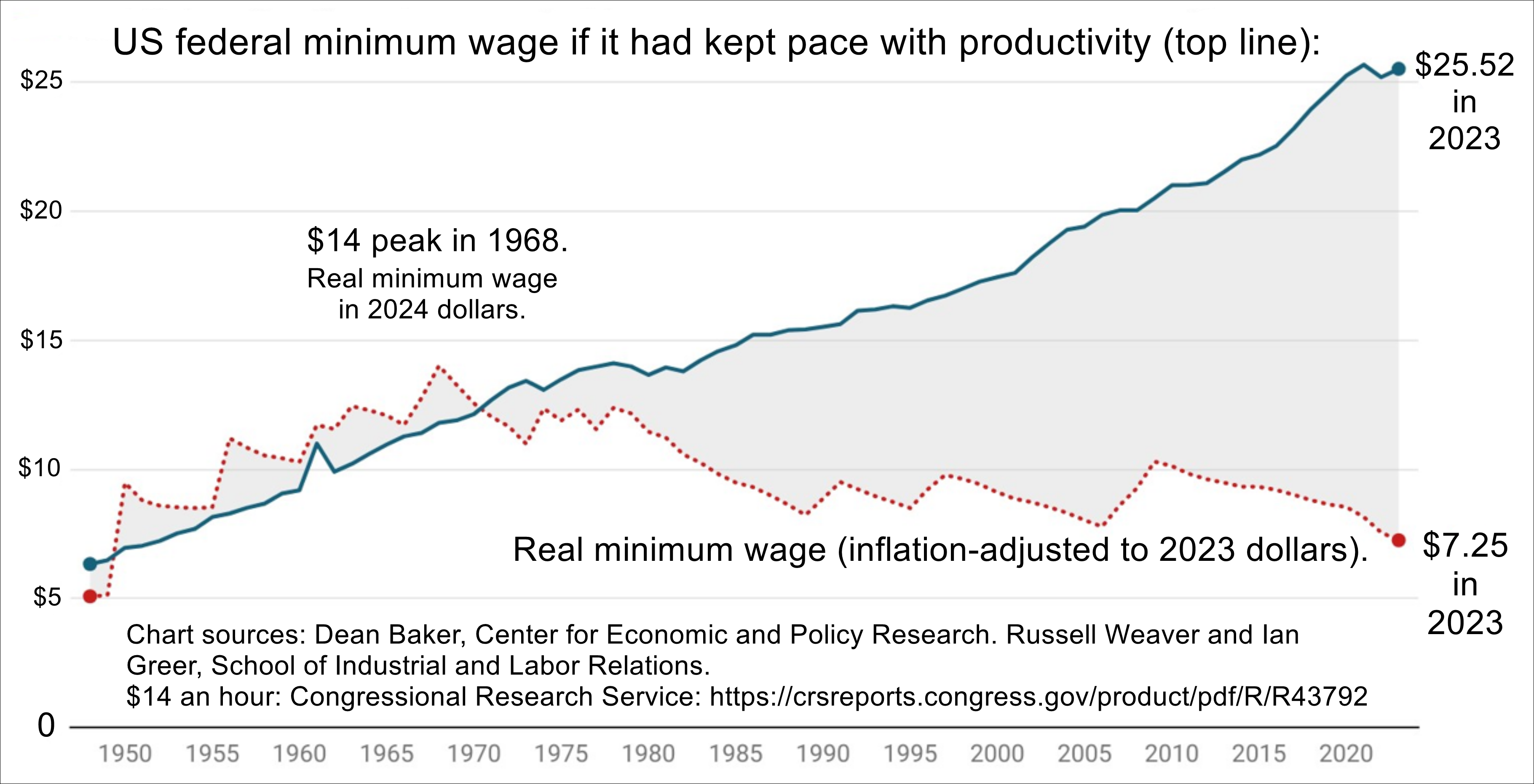
US federal minimum wage if it had kept pace with productivity. Also, the real minimum wage.

Income distribution can be assessed using a variety of income definitions. Adjustments are applied for various reasons, particularly to better reflect the actual economic resources available to a given individual/household.

- Market income—Labor income; business income; capital income (including capital gains); income received in retirement for past services; and other non-governmental sources of income
- Income before taxes and transfers (IBTT)—market income plus social insurance benefits (including benefits from Social Security, Medicare, unemployment insurance, and workers' compensation)
- Adjusted compensation or income after taxes and transfers—IBTT plus employee benefits and transfers such as housing subsidies, minus taxes
- Gini coefficient—Summarizes income distribution. It uses a scale from 0 to 1. Zero represents perfect equality (everyone having the same income), while 1 represents perfect inequality (one person receiving all the income). (Index scores are commonly multiplied by 100.)

The CBO explains the Gini as "A standard composite measure of income inequality is the Gini coefficient, which summarizes an entire distribution in a single number that ranges from zero to one. A value of zero indicates complete equality (for example, if each household received the same amount of income), and a value of one indicates complete inequality (for example, if a single household received all the income). Thus, a Gini coefficient that increases over time indicates rising income inequality."

"The Gini coefficient can also be interpreted as a measure of one-half of the average difference in income between every pair of households in the population, divided by the average income of the total population. For example, the Gini coefficient of 0.513 for 2016 indicates that the average difference in income between pairs of households in that year was equal to 102.6 percent (twice 0.513) of the average household income in 2016, or about $70,700 (adjusted for differences in household size). Similarly, the Gini coefficient of 0.521 projected for 2021 indicates that the average difference in income between pairs of households would equal 104.2 percent (twice 0.521) of average household income in 2021, or about $77,800 (in 2016 dollars)."

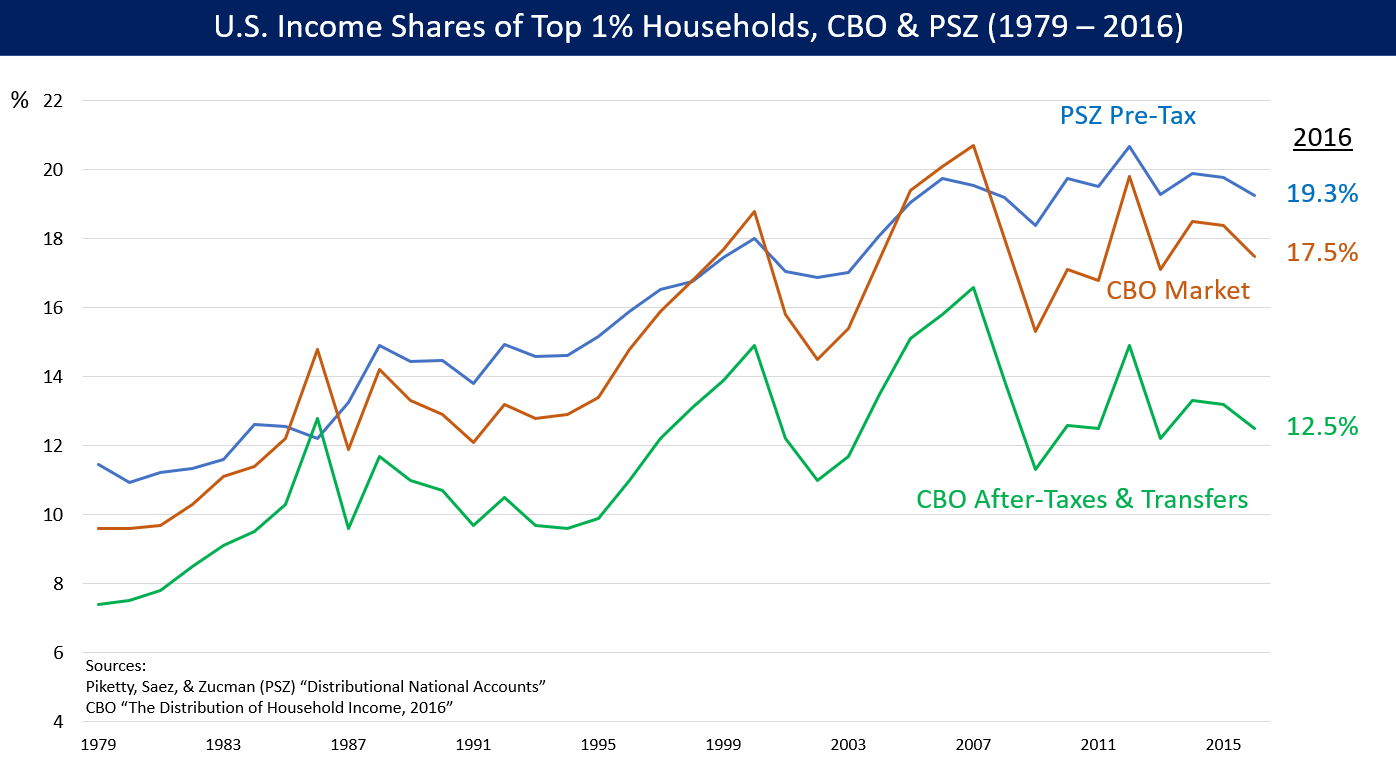
Top 1% share of US income pre-tax (blue and orange) and after-tax (green)

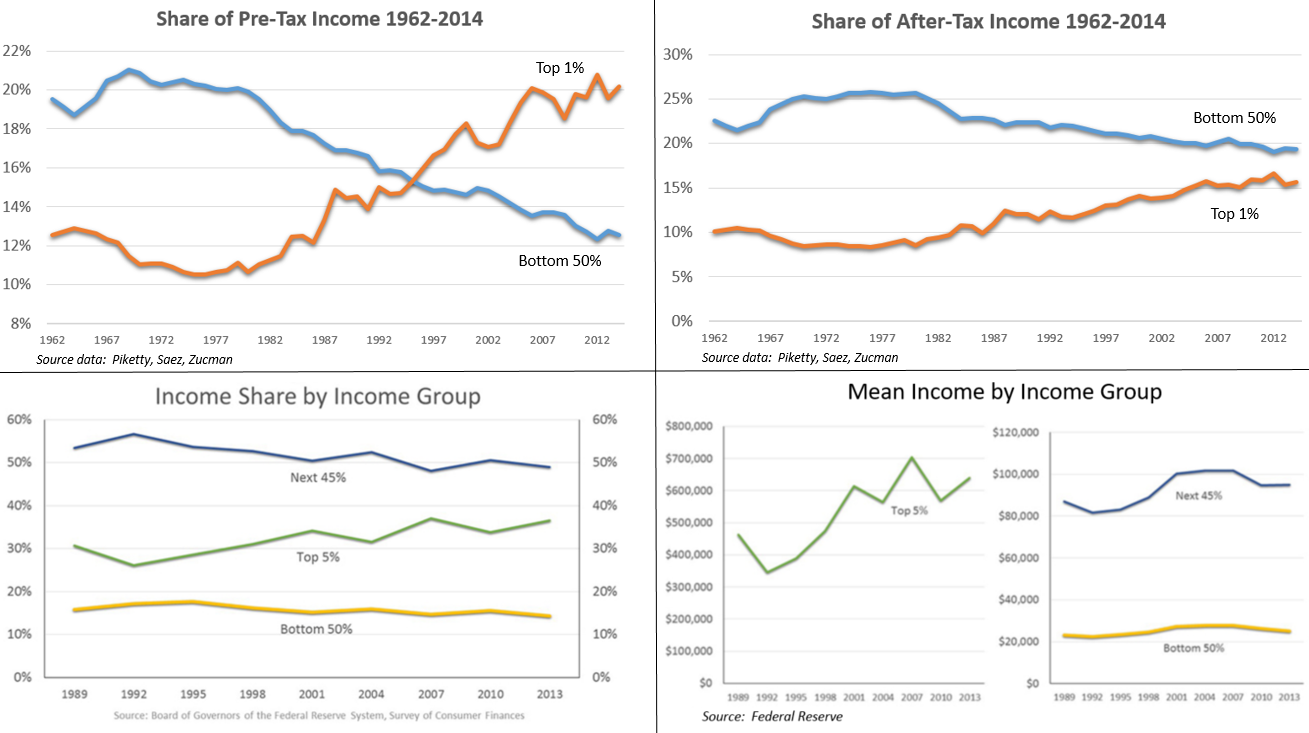
Four charts that describe trends in income inequality in the United States. Top left: the share of pre-tax income earned by the top 1% (orange) versus the bottom 50% (blue). Top right: the share of after-tax income earned by the top 1% (orange) versus the bottom 50% (blue). Bottom left: the share of income earned by the top 5% (green), next 45% (blue), and the bottom 50% (yellow). Bottom right: the mean income of the top 5% (green), next 45% (blue), and bottom 50% (yellow) income groups.

== History ==
Income inequality has fluctuated considerably since measurements began around 1915, declining between peaks in the 1920s and 2007 (CBO data) or 2012 (Piketty, Saez, Zucman data). Inequality steadily increased from around 1979 to 2007, with a small reduction through 2016, followed by an increase from 2016 to 2018.

=== Before the 20th century ===
In the late 18th century, "incomes were more equally distributed in colonial America than in any other place that can be measured," according to Peter Lindert and Jeffrey Williamson. The richest 1 percent of households held only 8.5% of total income in the late 18th century. Some reasons for this include the ease with which the average American could buy frontier land, which was abundant at the time, and an overall scarcity of labor in non-slaveholding areas, which forced landowners to pay higher wages. There were also relatively few poor people in America at the time, since only those with at least some money could afford to come.

In 1860, the top 1 percent collected almost one-third of property incomes, as compared to 13.7% in 1774. There was intense competition for land in cities and non-frontier areas during this period, with those who had already acquired land becoming richer than everyone else. The burgeoning financial sector also greatly rewarded the already-wealthy, as they were the only ones financially sound enough to invest.

=== 1913–1941 ===
An early governmental measure that slightly reduced inequality was the enactment of the first income tax in 1913. The 1918 household Gini coefficient (excluding capital gains) was 40.8. A brief but sharp depression in 1920-1921 reduced incomes. Income inequality rose from 1913, peaking in 1926 (1928 Gini 48.9, 1936 Gini 45.5) and 1941 (Gini 43.1), after which wartime measures of the Roosevelt administration began to equalize the income distribution. Social Security was enacted in 1935. At several points in this pre-World War II era, in which the Rockefellers and the Carnegies dominated American industry, the richest 1% of Americans earned over 20% of the income share.

=== Great Compression (1937–1967) ===
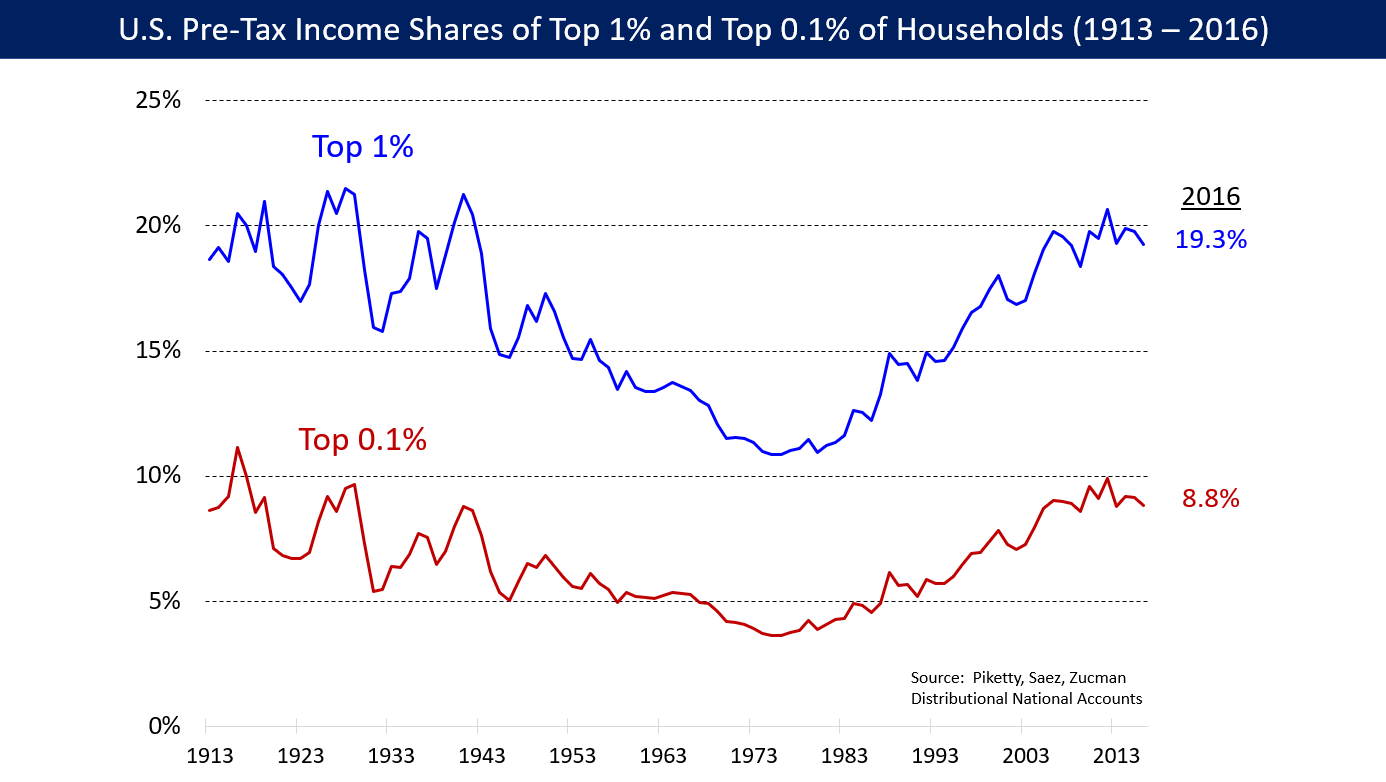
Share of U.S. pre-tax income earned by the top 1% (blue) and top 0.1% (red) of households 1913–2016

From about 1937 to 1947, a period dubbed as the "Great Compression", income inequality fell dramatically. The GINI fell into the high 30s. Progressive New Deal taxation, stronger unions, strong post-war economic growth and regulation by the National War Labor Board broadly raised market incomes and lowered the after-tax incomes of top earners. In the 1950s, marginal tax rates reached 91%, although the top 1% paid only about 16% in income taxes. Tax cuts in 1964 lowered marginal rates and closed loopholes. Medicare and Medicaid were enacted in 1965. The Earned Income Tax Credit was enacted in 1975.

The income change was the product of relatively high wages for trade union workers, lack of foreign manufacturing competition, and political support for redistributive government policies. By 1947, more than a third of non-farm workers were union members. Unions both raised average wages for their membership, and indirectly, and to a lesser extent, raised wages for non-union workers in similar occupations. Economist Paul Krugman claimed that political support for equalizing government policies was provided by high voter turnout from union voting drives, Southern support for the New Deal, and prestige that the massive mobilization and victory of World War II had given the government.

A 2022 study in the Economic Journal challenged the view that World War II was a great leveler of income inequality. The study points instead to a gradual decline in income inequality during the Great Depression, which extended into the war years.

=== 1979–2007 increase ===
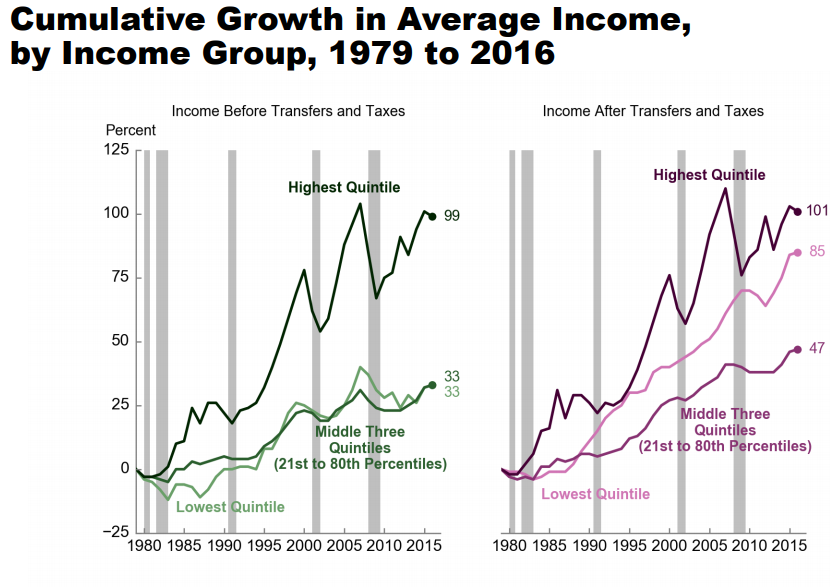
This CBO chart shows the cumulative increase in real household income by income quintile from 1979 to 2016, for income before taxes & transfers and after-tax income. It shows that even lower income quintiles still had sizable gains in income, although not as great as the top quintile.

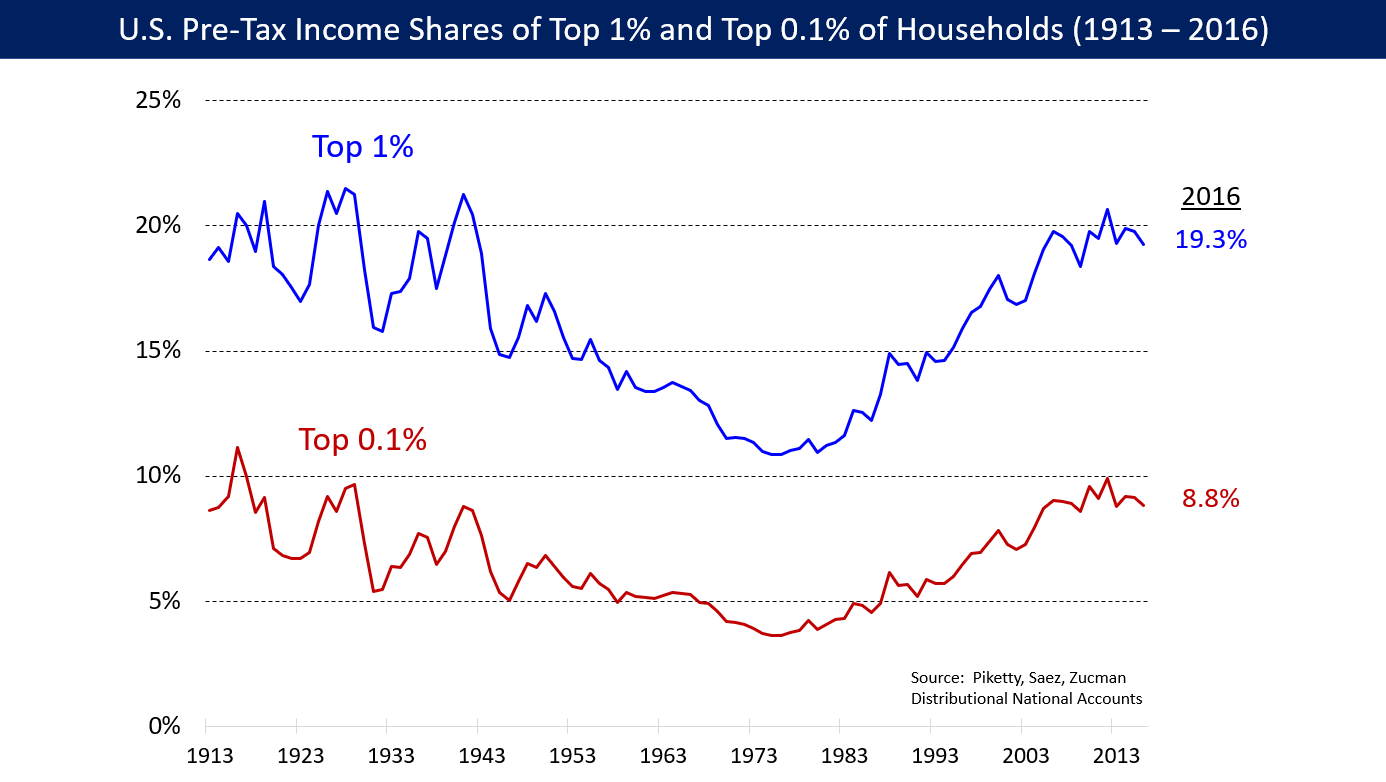

Americans have the highest income inequality in the rich world and over the past 20–30 years Americans have also experienced the greatest increase in income inequality among rich nations. The more detailed the data we can use to observe this change, the more skewed the change appears to be ... the majority of large gains are indeed at the top of the distribution.

— Timothy Smeeding

The return to high inequality began in the 1980s. The Gini first rose above 40 in 1983. Inequality rose almost continuously, with inconsequential dips during the economic recessions in 1990–91 (Gini 42.0), 2001 (Gini 44.6), and 2007. The lowest top 1% pre-tax income share measured between 1913 and 2016 was 10.9%, achieved in 1975, 1976, and 1980. By 1989, this figure was 14.4%; by 1999, 17.5%; and by 2007, 19.6%.

Major economic events that affected incomes included the return to lower inflation and higher growth, tax cuts and increases in the early 1980s, cuts following the 1986 tax reforms, tax increases in 1990 and 1993, expansion of the Children's Health Insurance Program in 1997, welfare reform, a 2000 recession, followed by tax cuts in 2001 and 2003 and increases in 2010.

The Nobel laureate, Princeton economist and The New York Times columnist Paul Krugman called this the Great Divergence, a reference to the "Great Compression", an earlier era in the 1930s and the 1940s when incomes became more equal in the US and elsewhere. He contrasts it with the "Great Prosperity" or Golden Age of Capitalism, where from the late 1940s to mid 1970s, at least for workers in the advanced economies, economic growth had delivered benefits broadly shared across the earnings spectrums, with inequality falling as the poorest sections of society increased their incomes at a faster rate than the richest.

CBO reported that for the 1979–2007 period, after-tax income (adjusted for inflation) of households in the top 1 percent of earners grew by 275%, compared to 65% for the next 19%, just under 40% for the next 60%, and 18% for the bottom fifth. The share of after-tax income received by the top 1% more than doubled from about 8% in 1979 to over 17% in 2007. The share received by the other 19 percent of households in the highest quintile edged up from 35% to 36%. The major cause was an increase in investment income. Capital gains accounted for 80% of the increase in market income for the households in the top 20% (2000–2007). Over the 1991–2000 period, capital gains accounted for 45% of market income for the top 20%.

CBO reported that less progressive tax and transfer policies contributed to an increase in after-tax/transfer inequality between 1979 and 2007.

Higher incomes due to a college education were a key reason middle-income households gained income share relative to those in the lower part of the distribution between 1973 and 2005. This was due in part to technology changes. However, education had less impact thereafter. Further, education did not explain why the top 1% gained disproportionately from around 1980 onward. Causes included executive pay trends and the financialization of the economy. For example, CEO pay expanded from around 30 times the typical worker's pay in 1980 to nearly 350 times by 2007. From 1978 to 2018, CEO compensation grew by 940% after adjusting for inflation, compared with 12% for the typical worker. A 2012 study reported that the main occupational shift for the top 1% was towards finance, while in 2009 "the richest 25 hedge-fund investors earned more than $25 billion, roughly six times as much as all the chief executives of companies in the S&P 500 stock index combined."

Scholars and others differ on the causes and significance of the divergence, which helped ignite the Occupy movement in 2011. While education and increased demand for skilled labour are often cited as causes of increased inequality, especially among conservatives, many social scientists point to conservative politics, neoliberal economic and social policies and public policy as an important cause of inequality; others believe its causes are not well understood.

The share of income held by the top 1 percent was as large in 2005 as in 1928. That year household Gini reached 45.

=== 2007–2016 reduction ===
==== CBO ====
The household income Gini index for the United States was 45.6 in 2009 and 45.4 in 2015, indicating a reduction in inequality during that period. CBO reported that the share of after-tax income received by the top 1% peaked in 2007 at 16.6%. It fell to 11.3% in 2009, due in part to the impact of the Great Recession on investment income, then increased thereafter to 14.9% by 2012 as the economy recovered. It then fell somewhat, reaching 12.5% by 2016, reflecting Obama policies, including the expiration of the Bush tax cuts for top incomes, and both tax increases on top incomes and redistribution to lower-income groups under the Affordable Care Act.

CBO reported that for the 1979-2016 period, after-tax income (adjusted for inflation) of households in the top 1 percent grew by 226%, compared to 65% for the 81st to 90th percentiles, 47% for the 20th to 80th percentiles, and 85% for the bottom fifth. The income growth for the top 1% was lower than during 1979-2007, while the bottom fifth experienced much higher growth, indicating a reduction in inequality from 2007 to 2016. The bottom quintile benefited from Medicaid expansion and refundable tax credits.

==== Saez, et al. ====
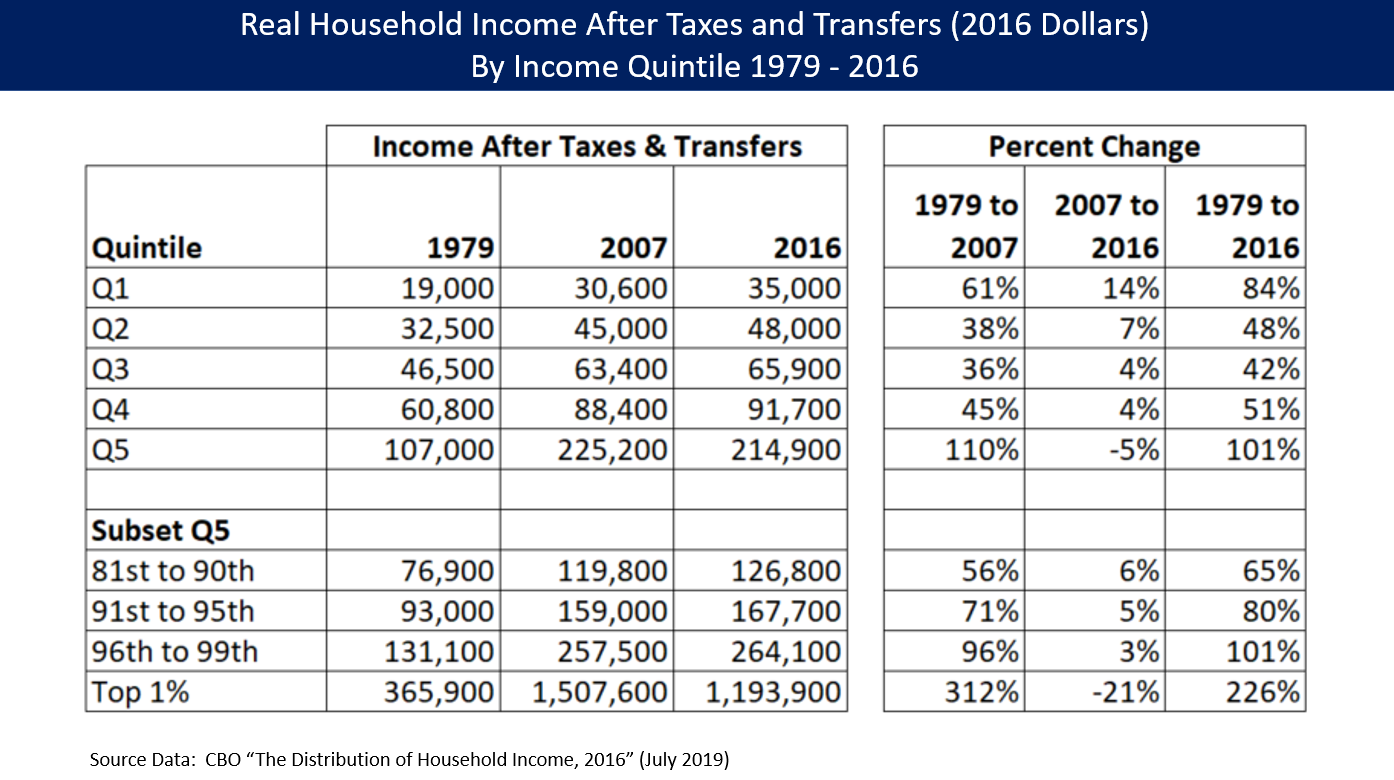
CBO data indicates that real (inflation-adjusted) household income increased significantly after-tax and transfers from 1979 to 2016 across all income quintiles. However, the top 1% income fell from 2007 to 2016, due to both the Great Recession and tax hikes on upper incomes during the Obama Administration.

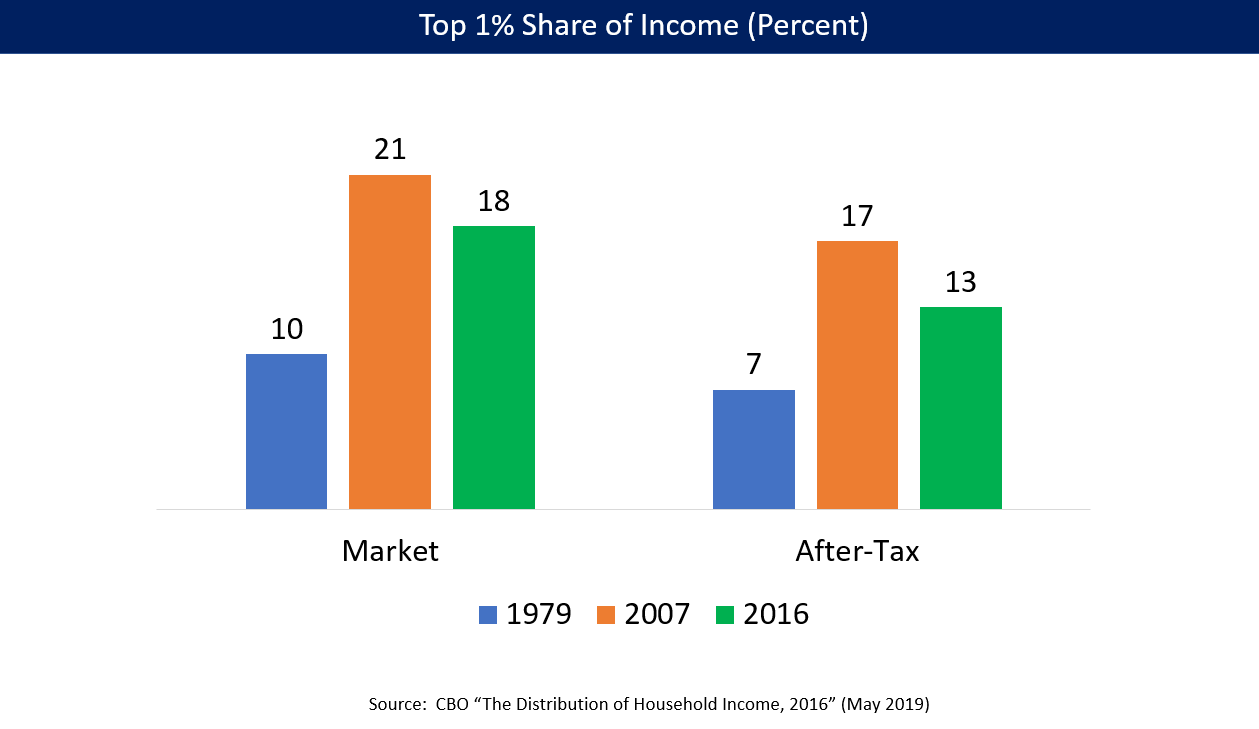
Share of U.S. income earned by top 1% households in 1979 (blue), 2007 (orange), and 2016 (green) (CBO data). The first date, 1979, reflects the more egalitarian pre-1980 period, 2007 was the peak inequality of the post-1980 period, and the 2016 number reflects the Obama tax increases on the top 1% along with residual effects of the Great Recession.

The top 1% earned 12% of market income in 1979, 20% in 2007, and 19% in 2016. For the bottom 50%, these figures were 20%, 14% and 13%, respectively. For the middle 40% group, a proxy for the middle class, these figures were 45%, 41%, and 41%, respectively. Measured by the share captured by the top 1%, by 2012, post-Great Recession market income inequality was as high as it was during the Roaring Twenties, at just over 20%.

The Great Recession took place from December 2007 to June 2009. From 2007 to 2010, total income going to the bottom 99 percent of Americans declined by 11.6%, while the top 1% fell by 36.3%.

In 2014, Saez and Gabriel Zucman reported that more than half of those in the top 1 percent had not experienced relative gains in wealth between 1960 and 2012. In fact, those between the top 1% and top .5% had lost relative wealth. Only those in the top .1% and above had made relative wealth gains during that time. Saez reported in 2013 that, from 2009 to 2012, the incomes of the top 1% grew by 31.4%, while the incomes of the bottom 99% grew by 0.4%.

In May 2017, they reported that income shares for those in the bottom half stagnated and declined from 1980 to 2014. Their share declined from 20% in 1980 to 12% in 2014, while the top 1% share rose from 12% in 1980 to 20% in 2014. The top 1% then made, on average, 81 times as much as the bottom 50%, while in 1981 they made 27 times as much. They attributed the growth in inequality from the 1970s to the 1990s to wage growth among top earners, and to investment income widening the gap.

=== Events ===
The Great Recession lasted from 2008 to 2009, multiplying unemployment and crashing the stock market. Obama administration policies addressed inequality in three main ways, contributing to a reduction in the share of income going to the top 1% measured between 2007 and 2016, both pre-tax and after-tax:

- Tax increases on top incomes. The Bush tax cuts were extended only to the bottom 98-99% of income earners in 2013. CBO reported that the average federal tax rate on the top 1% increased from 28.6% in 2012 to 33.6% in 2013–2014, and remained at 33.3% in 2015–2016.
- The Affordable Care Act. CBO estimated the ACA shifted approximately $21,000 in after-tax income from the average top 1% household via the investment income tax and the Medicare tax, to provide $600 in health insurance subsidies to the average bottom 40% household via insurance subsidies and expanded Medicaid. The Medicaid and CHIPs expansions amounted to 80% of the increase in means-tested transfers between 1979 and 2016.
- Anti-poverty programs. The Supplemental Nutrition Assistance Program (food stamps) and unemployment insurance were expanded.

=== Post-2016 increase ===
Average income—which heavily weights extremely high-income families—substantially exceeds median income (families in the fiftieth percentile). Further, average income outgrew median income from 2019 through 2022.

In 2017, the Tax Cuts and Jobs Act of 2017 reduced personal and corporate income tax rates, which critics said would increase income inequality.

Also in 2017, Forbes found that just three individuals (Jeff Bezos, Warren Buffett, and Bill Gates) held more wealth than the bottom half of the population.

In 2018, and for the first time in U.S. history, U.S. billionaires paid a lower effective tax rate than the working class. A study found that the average effective tax rate paid by the richest 400 families in the country was 23 percent, a full percentage point lower than the 24.2 percent rate paid by the bottom half of American households.

In September 2019, the Census Bureau reported that income inequality in the United States had reached its highest level in 50 years, with the GINI index increasing from 48.2 in 2017 to 48.5 in 2018.

If the United States had the same income distribution it had in 1979, the bottom 80 percent of the population would have $1 trillion – or $11,000 per family – more. The top 1 percent would have $1 trillion – or $750,000 – less.

— Larry Summers in 2015

In December 2019, the CBO forecast that inequality would increase between 2016 and 2021. Their report had several conclusions: (Adjusted for inflation)

- Before taxes and transfers, all income groups will see income growth, with the largest increases being for the highest and lowest quintiles. After taxes and transfers, that income growth is more skewed toward the higher-income households.
- The ratio of means-tested transfers (aid for people experiencing poverty) to income (BTT) will decrease, mainly because of income growth at the bottom of the distribution, which makes those households ineligible for transfers.
- Lower federal taxes for all income groups, with the greatest decrease for the highest income households, predominantly because of the Trump tax cuts.
- Income inequality is projected to increase, both before taxes and transfers, and after taxes and transfers, from Ginis of .513 to .521 and .423 to .437, respectively.

According to a December 2020 analysis of W-2 earnings data from the Economic Policy Institute U.S. income inequality is worsening, as the earnings of the top 1% nearly doubled from 7.3% in 1979 to 13.2% in 2019 while over the same time period the average annual wages for the bottom 90% have stayed within the $30,000 range, increasing from $30,880 to $38,923, representing 69.8% of total earnings in 1979 and 60.9% in 2019 respectively. The earnings of the top 0.1% surged from $648,725 in 1979 to nearly $2.9 million in 2019, an increase of 345%.

As of 2024, the average incomes in the US by quintile are: $18,640 (lowest), $49,380 (second), $84,390 (middle), $136,800 (fourth), and $316,100 (highest). Additionally, the average income for the top 5% of earners is $560,000.

The Institute for Policy Studies calculated that the average CEO/worker pay ratio of "Low-Wage 100" firms widened from 560:1 in 2019 to 632:1 in 2024. The extreme case was Starbucks, which had a 6,666:1 pay gap in 2024, its CEO receiving $95.8 million. Average CEO compensation within this category of companies was $17.2 million in 2024, while the median worker pay was $35,570.

== Causes ==
Income inequality and union participation have had a distinctly inverse relationship, with the disparity increasing since the 1980s.

In 2025, the wealthiest 1% of Americans owned nearly 50% of the stock market. The top 10% own 87.2%, and the bottom half owned 1.1%.

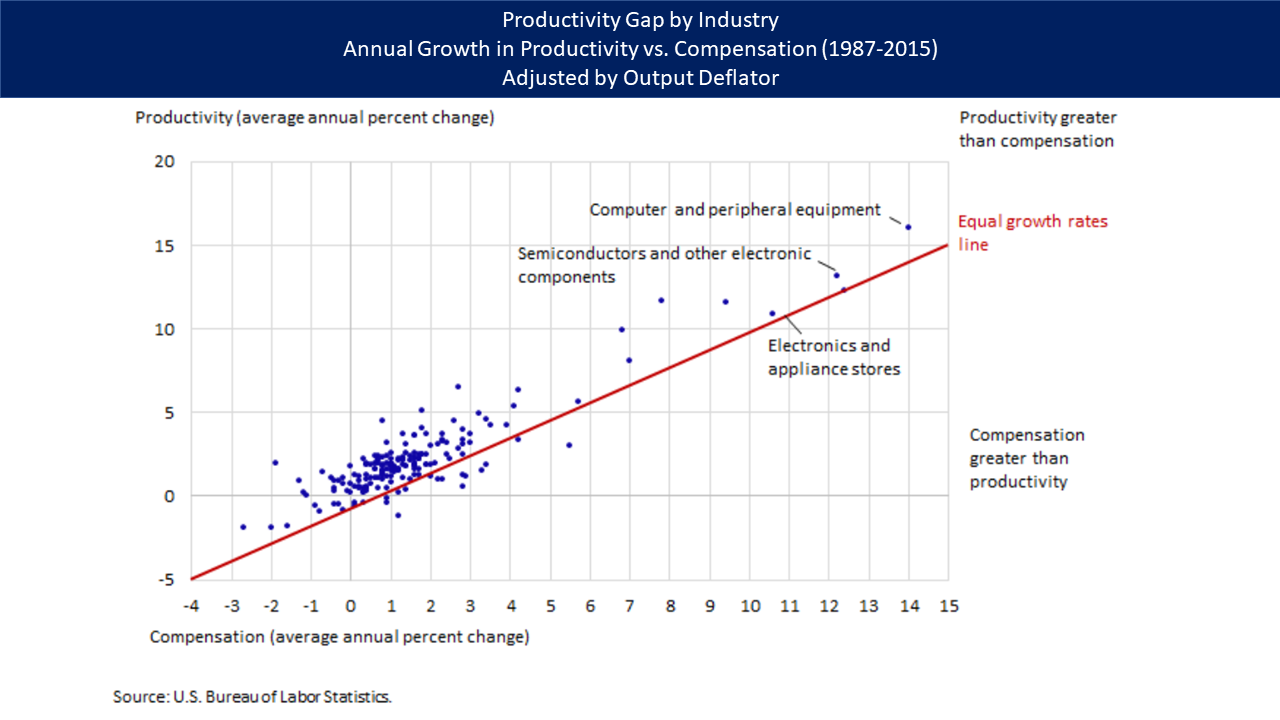
Illustrates the productivity gap (i.e., the annual growth rate in productivity minus annual growth rate in compensation) by industry from 1985 to 2015. Each dot is an industry; dots above the line have a productivity gap (i.e., productivity growth has exceeded compensation growth), those below the line do not.

Social connectedness to people of higher income levels is a strong predictor of upward income mobility. However, data show substantial social segregation correlating with economic income groups.

According to CBO (and others), the precise reasons for the [recent] rapid growth in income at the top are not well understood", but involved multiple, possibly conflicting, factors.

Causes include:

- decline of labor unions – Unions weakened in part due to globalization and automation may account for one-third to more than one-half of the rise of inequality among men. Pressure on employers to increase wages and on lawmakers to enact worker-friendly measures declined. Rewards from productivity gains went to executives, investors, and creditors. A study by Kristal and Cohen reported that rising wage inequality was driven more by declining unions and the fall in the real value of the minimum wage, with twice as much impact as technology. An alternative theory states that passthrough income's contribution is incorrectly attributed to capital rather than labor.
- globalization – Low-skilled American workers lost ground in the face of competition from low-wage workers in Asia and other "emerging" economies. However, surveys of American Economic Association (AEA) members in 2000, 2011, and 2020 showed that consistent majorities of professional economists in the United States disagreed with the statement: "The increasing inequality in the distribution of income in the U.S. is due primarily to the benefits and pressures of a global economy."
- skill-biased technological change – Rapid progress in information technology increased the demand for skilled and educated workers.
- superstars – Modern communication technologies often turn competition into a "winner take most" tournament in which the winner is richly rewarded, while the runners-up get far less.
- financialization – The increased financialization of the economy starting in the 1970s, according to Marie Gottschalk, "facilitated an astounding upward redistribution of wealth and political power." In the 1990s stock market capitalization rose from 55% to 155% of Gross Domestic Product (GDP). Corporations began to shift executive compensation toward stock options, increasing incentives for managers to make decisions to increase share prices. Average annual CEO options increased from $500,000 to over $3 million. Stock comprised almost 50% of CEO compensation. Managers were incentivized to increase shareholder wealth rather than to improve long-term contracts with workers; between 2000 and 2007, nearly 75% of increased stock growth came at the cost of labor wages and salaries.
- immigration of less-educated workers – Relatively high levels of immigration of low-skilled workers since 1965 may have reduced wages for American-born high school dropouts;
- college premium - Workers with college degrees traditionally earned more and faced a lower unemployment rate than others. Wealthy families are also more likely to send their children to schools that have large endowments, resulting in more grants and lower student debt. The cycle is completed when wealthier alums donate more, disproportionately increasing the size of elite endowments. Elite colleges also have better access to financial expertise.
- automation - The Bureau of Labor Statistics (BLS) found that increased automation had led to "an overall drop in the need for labor input. This would cause capital share to increase, relative to labor share, as machines replace some workers."

We haven't achieved the minimalist state that libertarians advocate. What we've achieved is a state too constrained to provide the public goods – investments in infrastructure, technology, and education – that would make for a vibrant economy and too weak to engage in the redistribution that is needed to create a fair society. But we have a state that is still large enough and distorted enough that it can provide a bounty of gifts to the wealthy.

— Joseph Stiglitz
- policy – Critics have argued that neoliberal policies have increased economic inequality and exacerbated global poverty. According to Krugman, movement conservatives increased their influence over the Republican Party beginning in the 1970s. In the same era, it increased its political power. The result was less progressive tax laws, anti-labor policies, and slower expansion of the welfare state relative to other developed nations (e.g., the unique absence of universal healthcare). Further, variation in income inequality across developed countries indicates that policy has a significant influence on inequality; Japan, Sweden, and France have income inequality around 1960 levels. The US was an early adopter of neoliberalism, which shifted the distribution of income from labor to capital, and whose focus on growth over equality spread to other countries over time. Nevertheless, the United States remains, according to Jonathan Hopkin, "the most extreme case of the subjection of society to the brute force of the market." As such, he argues that this made the United States an outlier, with economic inequality reaching "unprecedented levels for the rich democracies." The Center for Economic and Policy Research's (CEPR) Dean Baker argued in 2006 that the driving force behind rising inequality in the United States has been a series of deliberate neoliberal policy choices, including anti-inflationary bias, anti-unionism and profiteering in the healthcare industry. The economists David Howell and Mamadou Diallo contend that neoliberal policies have contributed to a United States economy in which 30% of workers earn low wages (less than two-thirds the median wage for full-time workers) and 35% of the labor force is underemployed while only 40% of the working-age population in the country is adequately employed.
- corporatism and corpocracy – Excessive attention to the interests of corporations reduced scrutiny over compensation shifts.
- female labor force participation – High-earning households are more likely to be dual-earner households.
- stock ownership is tilted towards households at higher income and education levels, resulting in disparate investment income.
- household structure - increase in single-headed households and increase of assortive mating - single-headed households have increased from 15% of households in the late 1980's to 20% in the mid-2000's; during that same timeframe, couples where both partners work and whose individual earnings are in the same or neighbouring earnings deciles increased from 33% to 40%. (High-income earners are more likely to marry a high-earning spouse, and low earners are more likely to marry a low-earning spouse.)

Higher-income households are disproportionately likely to prosper when economic times are good, and to suffer losses during downturns. More of their income comes from relatively volatile capital income. For example, in 2011, the top 1% of income earners derived 37% of their income from labor, versus 62% for the middle quintile. The top 1% derived 58% of their income from capital, compared with 4% for the middle quintile. Government transfers accounted for only 1% of the income of the top 1% but 25% of the middle quintile's income; the dollar amounts of these transfers tend to rise during recessions.

According to a 2018 report by the Organization of Economic Cooperation and Development (OECD), the US has higher income inequality and a larger percentage of low income workers than almost any other advanced nation because unemployed and at-risk workers get less support from the government and a weak collective bargaining system.

== Effects ==
=== Economic ===
Income inequality may contribute to slower economic growth, reduced income mobility, higher levels of household debt, and greater risk of financial crises and deflation.

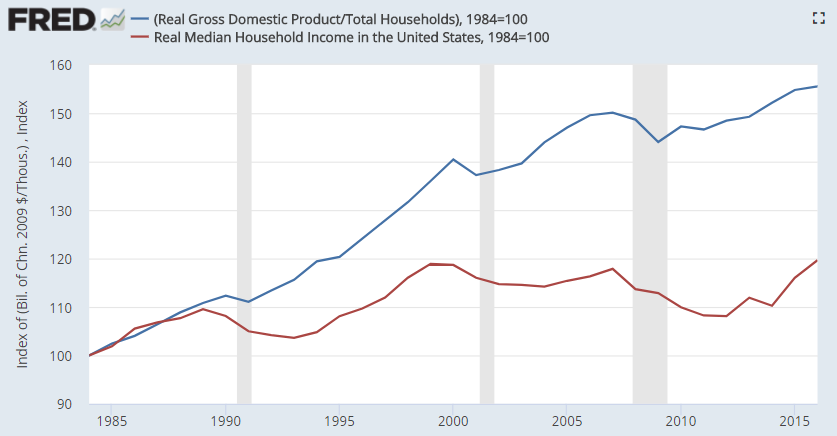
Real GDP per household has typically increased since the year 2000, while real median income per household was below 1999 levels until 2016, indicating a trend of greater income inequality (i.e., the average is more influenced by high income outliers than the median). The income considered in the two lines also differs: the GDP figure includes all income (derived from labor and capital), while the median income figure includes only a subset (wages/salaries, but not benefits).

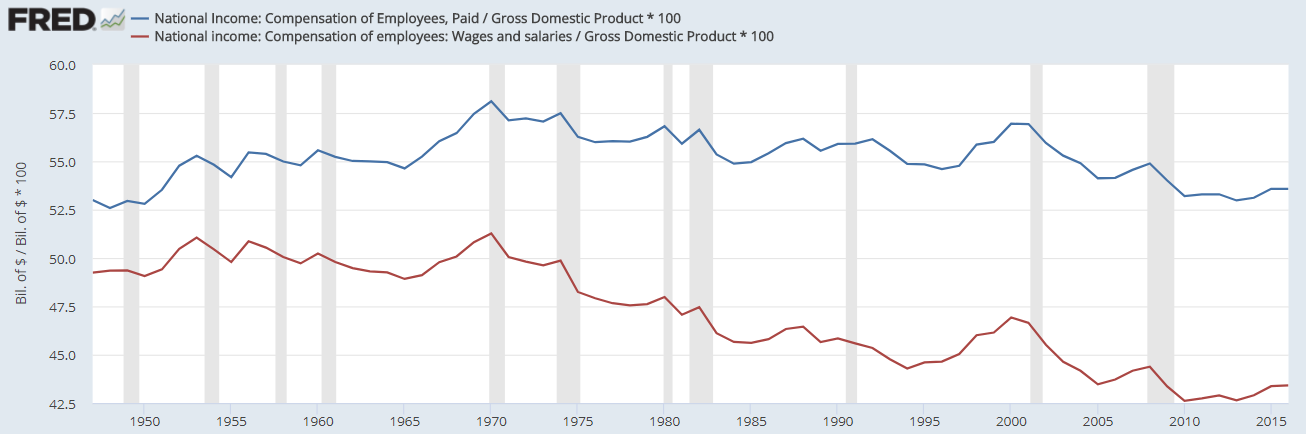
Labor's share of GDP declined by 4.5 percentage points from 1970 to 2016, measured based on total compensation. The decline measured for wages and salaries was 7.9 points. These trends imply income due to capital (i.e., asset ownership, such as rent, dividends, and business profits) is increasing as a % of GDP.

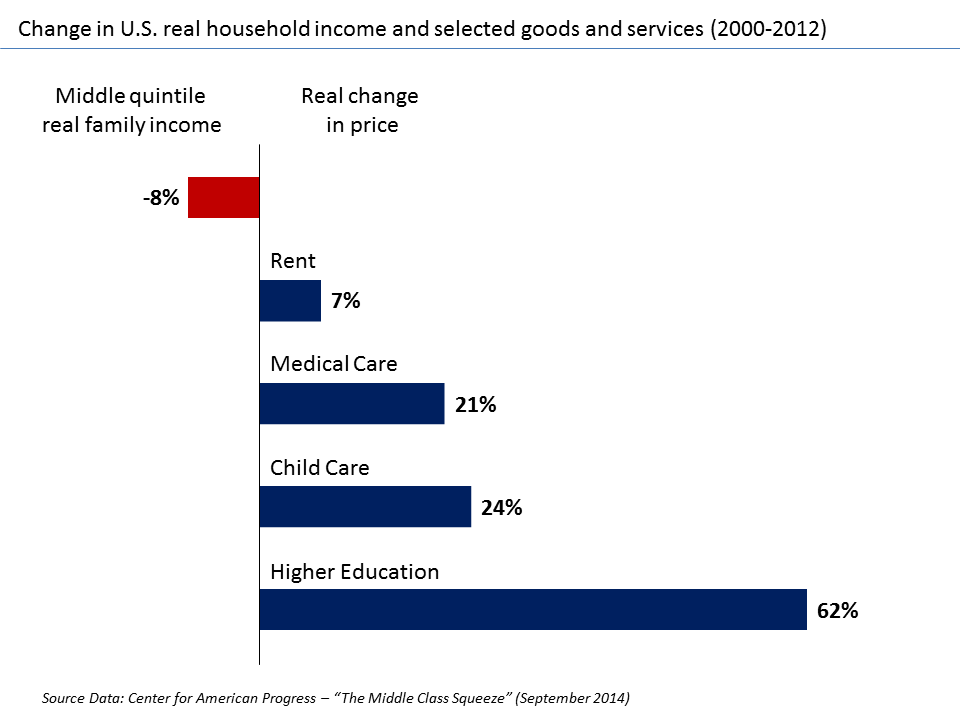
While middle-class family incomes have stagnated as income shifts to the top, the costs of important goods and services continue rising, resulting in a "Middle class squeeze."

While a 2000 survey of American Economic Association members found that only 53 percent disagreed with the statement that "The distribution of income and wealth has little, if any, impact on economic stability and growth", surveys from 2011 and 2020 found 73 percent and 78 percent disagreed respectively.

==== Economic growth ====
Krueger wrote in 2012: "The rise in inequality in the United States over the last three decades has reached the point that inequality in incomes is causing an unhealthy division in opportunities, and is a threat to our economic growth. Restoring a greater degree of fairness to the U.S. job market would be good for businesses, good for the economy, and good for the country." Since the wealthy tend to save nearly 50% of their marginal income while the remainder of the population saves roughly 10%, other things equal, this would reduce annual consumption (the largest component of GDP) by as much as 5%, but would increase investment, at least some of which would likely take place in the US. Krueger wrote that borrowing likely helped many households make up for this shift.

Inequality in land and income ownership is negatively correlated with subsequent economic growth. Increasing inequality harms growth in countries with high levels of urbanization.

High unemployment rates have a significant negative effect when interacting with increases in inequality. High unemployment also harms long-run economic growth. Unemployment may seriously harm growth because resources sit idle, because it generates redistributive pressures and distortions, because it idles human capital and deters its accumulation, because it drives people to poverty, because it results in liquidity constraints that limit labor mobility, and because it erodes individual self-esteem and promotes social dislocation, unrest, and conflict. Policies to control unemployment and reduce its inequality-associated effects can strengthen long-run growth.

Economists such as David Moss, Krugman, and Raghuram Rajan believe the "Great Divergence" may be connected to the 2008 financial crisis.

Even conservatives must acknowledge that return on capital investment, and the liquid stocks and bonds that mimic it, are ultimately dependent on returns to labor in the form of jobs and real wage gains. If Main Street is unemployed and undercompensated, capital can only travel so far down Prosperity Road.... Investors/policymakers of the world wake up – you're killing the proletariat goose that lays your golden eggs."

— William H. Gross, former managing director of PIMCO

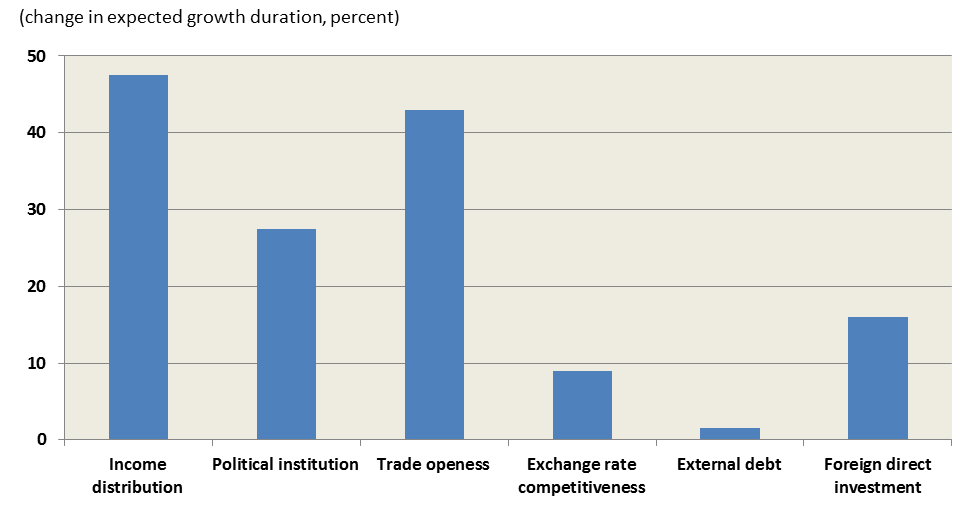
A 2011 study by Ostry and Berg of the factors affecting the duration of economic growth in developed and developing countries found that income equality has a more beneficial impact on steady growth than trade openness, sound political institutions, or foreign investment.

A December 2013 Associated Press survey of three dozen economists', a 2014 report by Standard and Poor's and economists Gar Alperovitz, Robert Reich, Joseph Stiglitz, Branko Milanovic and Robert Gordon agree about the harms of inequality.

The majority of respondents in the Associated Press survey agreed that widening income disparity was harming the US economy. They argue that wealthy Americans are receiving higher pay, but they spend less per dollar earned than middle-class consumers, whose incomes have largely stagnated.

The S&P report concluded that diverging income inequality had slowed the recovery and could contribute to future boom-and-bust cycles, given increasing personal debt levels. Higher levels of income inequality increase political pressures, discouraging trade, investment, hiring, and social mobility.

Alperovitz and Reich argued that concentration of wealth does not leave sufficient purchasing power for the economy to function effectively.

Stiglitz argued that wealth and income concentration lead the economic elite to protect themselves from redistributive policies by weakening the state, which lessens public investments – roads, technology, education, etc. – that are essential for economic growth.

Milanovic stated that while traditionally economists thought inequality was good for growth, "When physical capital mattered most, savings and investments were key. Then it was important to have a large contingent of rich people who could save a greater proportion of their income than the poor and invest it in physical capital. But now that human capital is scarcer than machines, widespread education has become the secret to growth", and that while "broadly accessible education" is difficult to achieve under inequality, education tends to reduce income gaps.

Gordon wrote that such issues as 'rising inequality; factor price equalization stemming from the interplay between globalization and the Internet; the twin educational problems of cost inflation in higher education and poor secondary student performance; the consequences of environmental regulations and taxes ..." make economic growth harder to achieve.

In response to the Occupy movement, legal scholar Richard Epstein defended inequality in a free market society, maintaining that "taxing the top one percent even more means less wealth and fewer jobs for the rest of us." According to Epstein, "the inequalities in wealth ... pay for themselves by the vast increases in wealth", while "forced transfers of wealth through taxation ... will destroy the pools of wealth that are needed to generate new ventures".

According to a 2020 study by the RAND Corporation, the typical worker, defined in the study as a "Full-Year, Full-Time, Prime-Aged Worker", makes $42,000 less than they would have if income inequality had not increased over the last four decades. The study also shows that white working-class males and rural workers who work full-time have been the hardest hit, while the higher-income earners captured the vast majority of economic growth over the same time period. The total wealth difference would have exceeded $50 trillion by early 2020, an amount that would have led to a more prosperous economy and a healthier, more financially secure population. The report concludes that the American economy's radical inequality is hindering economic growth, as the benefits are mainly enjoyed by those at the top, while the majority, responsible for the bulk of consumer spending, which constitutes 67% of GDP, are left behind.

==== Financial crises ====
Income inequality was cited as one of the causes of the Great Depression by Supreme Court Justice Louis D. Brandeis in 1933. In his dissent in the Louis K. Liggett Co. v. Lee (288 U.S. 517) case, he wrote: "Other writers have shown that, coincident with the growth of these giant corporations, there has occurred a marked concentration of individual wealth; and that the resulting disparity in incomes is a major cause of the existing depression."

Rajan argued that "systematic economic inequalities, within the United States and around the world, have created deep financial 'fault lines' that have made [financial] crises more likely to happen than in the past".

==== Monopoly, labor, consolidation, and competition ====
Greater income inequality can lead to monopolization, resulting in fewer employers requiring fewer workers. Remaining employers can consolidate and take advantage of the relative lack of competition.

==== Aggregate demand ====
Income inequality is claimed to lower aggregate demand, leading to large segments of formerly middle-class consumers unable to afford as many goods and services. This pushes production and overall employment down.

=== Income mobility ===
The ability to move from one income group into another (income mobility) is a measure of economic opportunity. A higher probability of upward income mobility would theoretically help mitigate income inequality, as each generation has a better chance of achieving higher income.

Several studies indicated that higher income inequality is associated with lower income mobility. In other words, income brackets tend to be increasingly "sticky" as income inequality increases. This is described by the Great Gatsby curve. Noah summarized this as "you can't really experience ever-growing income inequality without experiencing a decline in Horatio Alger-style upward mobility because (to use a frequently-employed metaphor) it's harder to climb a ladder when the rungs are farther apart."

==== Over lifetimes ====
A 2013 Brookings Institution study claimed that income inequality was increasing and becoming permanent, sharply reducing social mobility. A 2007 study found the top population in the United States "very stable" and that income mobility had not "mitigated the dramatic increase in annual earnings concentration since the 1970s."

Krugman argued that while in any given year, some people with low incomes will be "workers on temporary layoff, small businessmen taking write-offs, farmers hit by bad weather" – the rise in their income in succeeding years is not the same 'mobility' as poor people rising to middle class or middle income rising to high income. It's the mobility of "the guy who works in the college bookstore and has a real job by his early thirties."

Studies by the Urban Institute and the US Treasury have both found that about half of the families who start in either the top or the bottom quintile of the income distribution are still there after a decade, and that only 3 to 6% rise from bottom to top or fall from top to bottom.

On the issue of whether most Americans stay in the same income bracket over time, the 2011 CBO distribution of income study reported:

Household income measured over a multi-year period is more equally distributed than income measured over one year, although only modestly so. Given the fairly substantial movement of households across income groups over time, it might seem that income measured over a number of years should be significantly more equally distributed than income measured over one year. However, much of the movement of households involves changes in income that are large enough to push households into different income groups but not large enough to greatly affect the overall distribution of income. Multi-year income measures also show the same pattern of increasing inequality over time as is observed in annual measures.

In other words,

many people who have incomes greater than $1 million one year fall out of the category the next year – but that's typically because their income fell from, say, $1.05 million to .95 million, not because they went back to being middle class.

Disagreements about the correct procedure for measuring income inequality continue to be a topic of debate among economists, including a panel discussion at the 2019 American Economic Association annual meeting.

==== Between generations ====
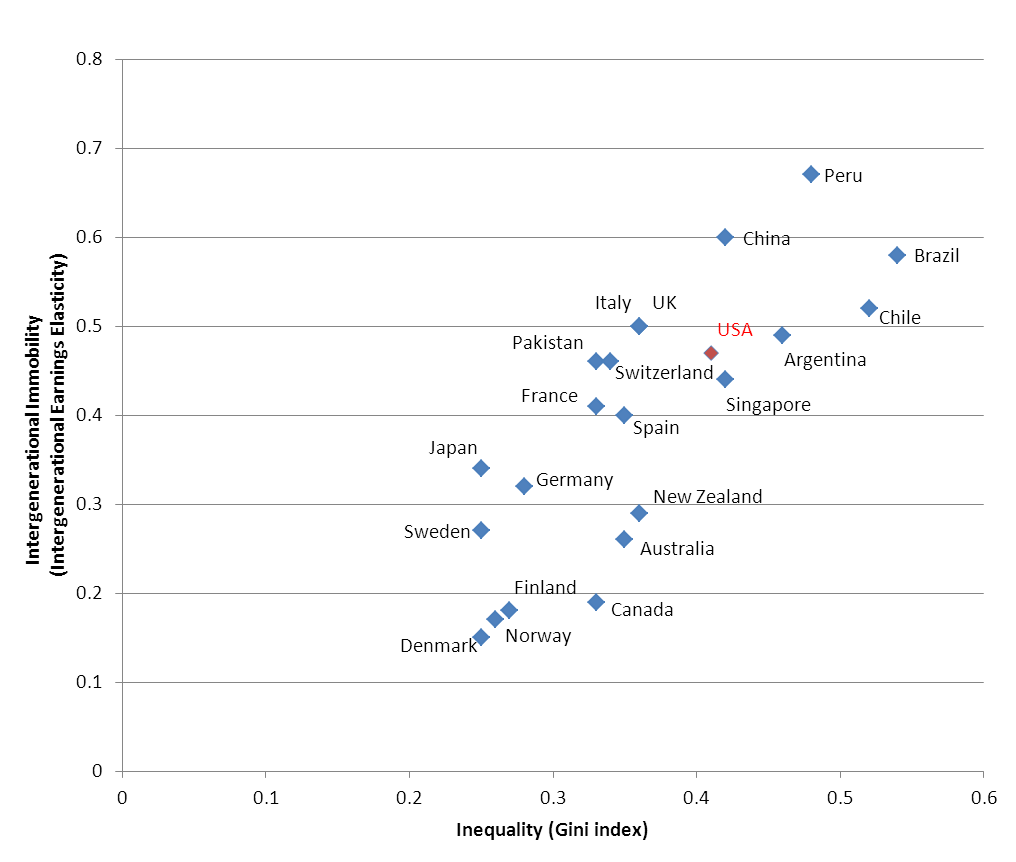
The Great Gatsby curve showing intergenerational economic immobility on the vertical axis and increasing inequality on the horizontal axis for several different countries

Several studies found the ability of children from poor or middle-class families to rise to upper income – known as "upward relative intergenerational mobility" – is lower in the US than in other developed countries. Krueger and Corak found lower mobility to be linked to income inequality.

In their Great Gatsby curve, Labor economist Miles Corak found a negative correlation between inequality and social mobility. The curve plotted intergenerational income mobility, the likelihood that someone will match their parents' relative income level, and inequality for various countries.

The connection between income inequality and low mobility can be explained by the lack of access to and preparation for schools that are crucial for high-paying jobs; lack of health care may lead to obesity and diabetes and limit education and employment.

Krueger estimated that "the persistence in the advantages and disadvantages of income passed from parents to the children" will "rise by about a quarter for the next generation as a result of the rise in inequality that the U.S. has seen in the last 25 years."

=== Poverty ===
Greater income inequality can increase the market income poverty rate, as income shifts from lower to higher brackets. Jared Bernstein wrote, "If less of the economy's market-generated growth – i.e., before taxes and transfers kick in – ends up in the lower reaches of the income scale, either there will be more poverty for any given level of GDP growth, or there will have to be a lot more transfers to offset inequality's poverty-inducing impact."

From 1990 to 1999, household income grew 0.8% while real medium income fell 0.7% from 2000 to 2010. According to the Council of economic advisors, if income grew in 2000 the same way it did in 1990’s, the medium household would have had extra $8,900 annual income in 2010. The Economic Policy Institute (EPI) estimated that greater income inequality added 5.5% to the poverty rate between 1979 and 2007, other factors equal. Income inequality was the largest driver of the change in the poverty rate, with economic growth, family structure, education, race and other important factors. An estimated 11.8% of Americans lived in poverty in 2018, versus 16% in 2012 and 26% in 1967. The poverty threshold in the United States was at $12,880 for a single-person household and $26,246 for a family of four in 2021. 0.25% of the U.S. population lived below the international poverty line of $2.15 per day in 2020.

A rise in income disparities weakens skills development among people with a poor educational background in terms of the quantity and quality of education attained.

=== Debt ===
Income inequality may be the driving factor in growing household debt, as high earners bid up the price of real estate and middle income earners go deeper into debt trying to maintain a middle class lifestyle. Between 1983 and 2007, the top 5 percent saw their debt fall from 80 cents for every dollar of income to 65 cents, while the bottom 95 percent saw their debt rise from 60 cents for every dollar of income to $1.40. Krugman found a strong correlation between inequality and household debt during the twentieth and early twenty-first centuries.

Twenty-first century college costs have risen much faster than income, resulting in an increase in student loan debt from $260 billion in 2004 to $1.6 trillion in 2019Q2. From 1995 to 2013, outstanding education debt grew from 26% of average yearly income to 58%, for households with net worth below the 50th percentile.

=== Democracy and society ===
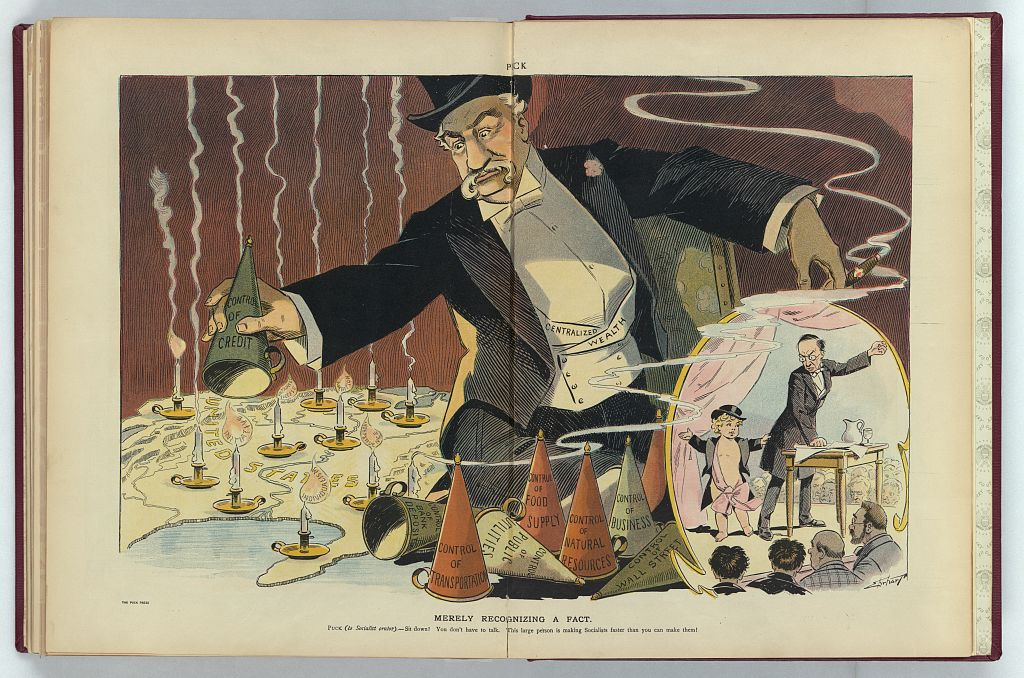
Political cartoon from the Progressive Era, when wealth concentration was similar to that of the present, shows how the concentration of wealth in a few hands leads to the extinguishing of individualism, initiative, ambition, untainted success, and independence.

Bernstein and Krugman assessed the concentration of income as variously "unsustainable" and "incompatible" with democracy. Political scientists Jacob S. Hacker and Paul Pierson quoted a warning by Greek-Roman historian Plutarch: "An imbalance between rich and poor is the oldest and most fatal ailment of all republics." Some academic researchers alleged that the US political system risks drifting towards oligarchy, through the influence of corporations, the wealthy and other special interest groups.

==== Political polarization ====
Rising income inequality has been linked to political polarization. Krugman wrote in 2014, "The basic story of political polarization over the past few decades is that, as a wealthy minority has pulled away economically from the rest of the country, it has pulled one major party along with it ... Any policy that benefits lower- and middle-income Americans at the expense of the elite – like health reform, which guarantees insurance to all and pays for that guarantee in part with taxes on higher incomes – will face bitter Republican opposition." He used environmental protection as another example, which became a partisan issue only after the 1990s. Evidence suggests the impact of national income inequality on regional economic divergence as one potential reason for the link between inequality and political polarization.

As income inequality increased, polarization in the House of Representatives, measured by voting records, increased as well. Inequality increased the influence of the rich on the regulatory, legislative, and electoral processes. McCarty, Pool and Rosenthal wrote in 2007 that Republicans had then moved away from redistributive policies that would reduce income inequality, whereas earlier, they had supported redistributive policies such as the EITC. Polarization thus completed a feedback loop, increasing inequality.

The IMF warned in 2017 that rising income inequality within Western nations, in particular the United States, could result in further political polarization.

==== Political inequality ====
Several economists and political scientists have argued that income inequality translates into political inequality, for example, when politicians have financial incentives to accommodate special interest groups. Researchers such as Larry Bartels found that politicians are significantly more responsive to the political opinions of the wealthy, even when controlling for a range of variables including educational attainment and political knowledge.

==== Class system ====
A class system is a society organized around the division of the population into groups having a permanent status that determines their relation to other groups. Such groups may be defined by income, religion and/or other characteristics. Class warfare is thus conflict between/among such classes.

Investor Warren Buffett said in 2006, "There's class warfare, all right, but it's my class, the rich class, that's making war, and we're winning." He advocated much higher taxes on the wealthiest Americans.

George Packer wrote, "Inequality hardens society into a class system ... Inequality divides us from one another in schools, in neighborhoods, at work, on airplanes, in hospitals, in what we eat, in the condition of our bodies, in what we think, in our children's futures, in how we die. Inequality makes it harder to imagine the lives of others."

In recent US history, the class conflict has taken the form of the "1% versus the 99%" issue, particularly as reflected in the Occupy movement and struggles over tax policy and redistribution. The movement spread to 600 communities in 2011. Its main political slogan – "We are the 99%" – referenced its dissatisfaction with the era's income inequality.

==== Political change ====
Increasing inequality is both a cause and effect of political change, according to journalist Hedrick Smith. The result was a political landscape dominated in the 1990s and 2000s by business groups, specifically "political insiders" – former members of Congress and government officials with an inside track – working for "Wall Street banks, the oil, defense, and pharmaceutical industries; and business trade associations." In the decade or so before the Great Divergence, middle-class-dominated reformist grassroots efforts – such as the civil rights movement, environmental movement, consumer movement, labor movement – had considerable political impact.

World trade significantly expanded in the 1990s and thereafter, with the creation of the World Trade Organization and the negotiation of the North American Free Trade Agreement. These agreements and related policies were widely supported by business groups and economists such as Krugman and Stiglitz. One outcome was greatly expanded foreign outsourcing, which has been argued to have hollowed out the middle class.

Stiglitz later argued that inequality may explain political questions – such as why America's infrastructure (and other public investments) are deteriorating, or the country's recent relative lack of reluctance to engage in military conflicts such as the Iraq War. Top-earning families have the money to buy their own education, medical care, personal security, and parks. They showed little interest in helping pay for such things for the rest of society, and have the political influence to make sure they don't have to. The relatively few children of the wealthy who joined the military may have reduced their concern about going to war.

Milanovic argued that globalization and immigration caused US middle-class wages to stagnate, fueling the rise of populist political candidates. Piketty attributed the victory of Donald Trump in the 2016 presidential election, to "the explosion in economic and geographic inequality in the United States over several decades and the inability of successive governments to deal with this."

==== Health ====
After rising for a century, average life expectancy in the U.S. is now declining. And for those in the bottom 90% of the income distribution, real (inflation-adjusted) wages have stagnated: the income of a typical male worker today is around where it was 40 years ago.

— Joseph Stiglitz

Using statistics from 23 developed countries and the 50 states of the US, British researchers Richard G. Wilkinson and Kate Pickett found a correlation that remains after accounting for ethnicity, national culture and occupational classes or education levels. Their findings place the United States as the most unequal and ranks poorly on social and health problems among developed countries. The authors argue inequality creates psychosocial stress and status anxiety that lead to social ills.

A 2009 study attributed one in three deaths in the United States to high levels of inequality. According to The Earth Institute, life satisfaction in the US has been declining over several decades, which they attributed to increasing inequality, lack of social trust and loss of faith in government.

A 2015 study by Angus Deaton and Anne Case found that income inequality could be a driving factor in a marked increase in deaths among white males between the ages of 45 and 54 in the period 1999 to 2013. So-called "deaths of despair", including suicide and drug/alcohol related deaths, which have been pushing down life expectancy since 2014, reached record levels in 2017. Some researchers assert that income inequality, a shrinking middle class, the weakening labor union influence, and stagnant wages have been significant factors in this development. In their 2020 book Deaths of Despair and the Future of Capitalism, Case and Deaton put forth the argument that in the United States, globalization and technological advancement dramatically shifted political power away from labor and towards capital by empowering corporations and weakening labor unions much more so than in peer countries such as those of Western Europe. As such, other rich countries, while facing their own challenges associated with globalization and technological change, did not experience a "long-term stagnation of wages, nor an epidemic of deaths of despair."

According to the Health Inequality Project, the wealthiest American men live 15 years longer than the poorest. For American women, the life expectancy gap is 10 years. People in the richest 25 percent of the population studied across the United States and Europe were 40 percent less likely to die during the study period than those in the poorest quarter, according to a new study published in the New England Journal of Medicine.

==== Political extremism and violence ====
A 2020 paper published in Science Advances posits that there is a correlation between economic inequality, poor economic conditions, and increased rates of political violence and right-wing extremism. A 2019 study of mass shootings published in BMC Public Health found that communities with rising levels of income inequality are at an increased risk of mass shootings.

==== Financing of social programs ====
Krugman argues that the long-term funding problems of Social Security and Medicare can be blamed in part on rising inequality, as well as on changes such as longer life expectancy. The source of funding for these programs is payroll taxes, which are traditionally levied as a percent of salary up to a cap. Payroll taxes do not capture income from capital or income above the cap. Higher inequality thereby reduces the taxable pool.

Had inequality remained stable, increased payments would have covered about 43% of the projected Social Security shortfall over the next 75 years.

==== Justice ====
Classical liberal economists such as Friedrich Hayek maintained that because individuals are diverse and different, state intervention to redistribute income is inevitably arbitrary and incompatible with the rule of law, and that "what is called 'social' or distributive' justice is indeed meaningless within a spontaneous order". Those who would use the state to redistribute, "take freedom for granted and ignore the preconditions necessary for its survival".

== Public attitudes ==
Americans are not generally aware of the extent of inequality or recent trends. In 1998 a Gallup poll found 52% of Americans agreeing that the gap between rich and the poor was a problem that needed to be fixed, while 45% regarded it as "an acceptable part of the economic system".

A December 2011 Gallup poll found a decline in the number of Americans who rated reducing the gap in income and wealth between the rich and the poor as extremely or very important (21 percent of Republicans, 43 percent of independents, and 72 percent of Democrats). Only 45% see the gap as in need of fixing, while 52% do not. However, there was a large difference between Democrats and Republicans, with 71% of Democrats calling for a fix.

In 2012, surveys found the issue ranked below issues such as growth and equality of opportunity, and ranked relatively low in affecting voters "personally".

A January 2014 poll found 61% of Republicans, 68% of Democrats, and 67% of independents accept that income inequality in the US had grown over the last decade. The poll indicated that 69% of Americans supported the government doing "a lot" or "some" to address income inequality and that 73% of Americans supported raising the minimum wage from $7.25 to $10.10 per hour.

Surveys found that Americans were comparable to citizens of other nations in what they considered acceptable equality, but were more accepting of the level they thought it should be. Dan Ariely and Michael Norton found in a 2011 study that US citizens significantly underestimated wealth inequality.

== States and cities ==
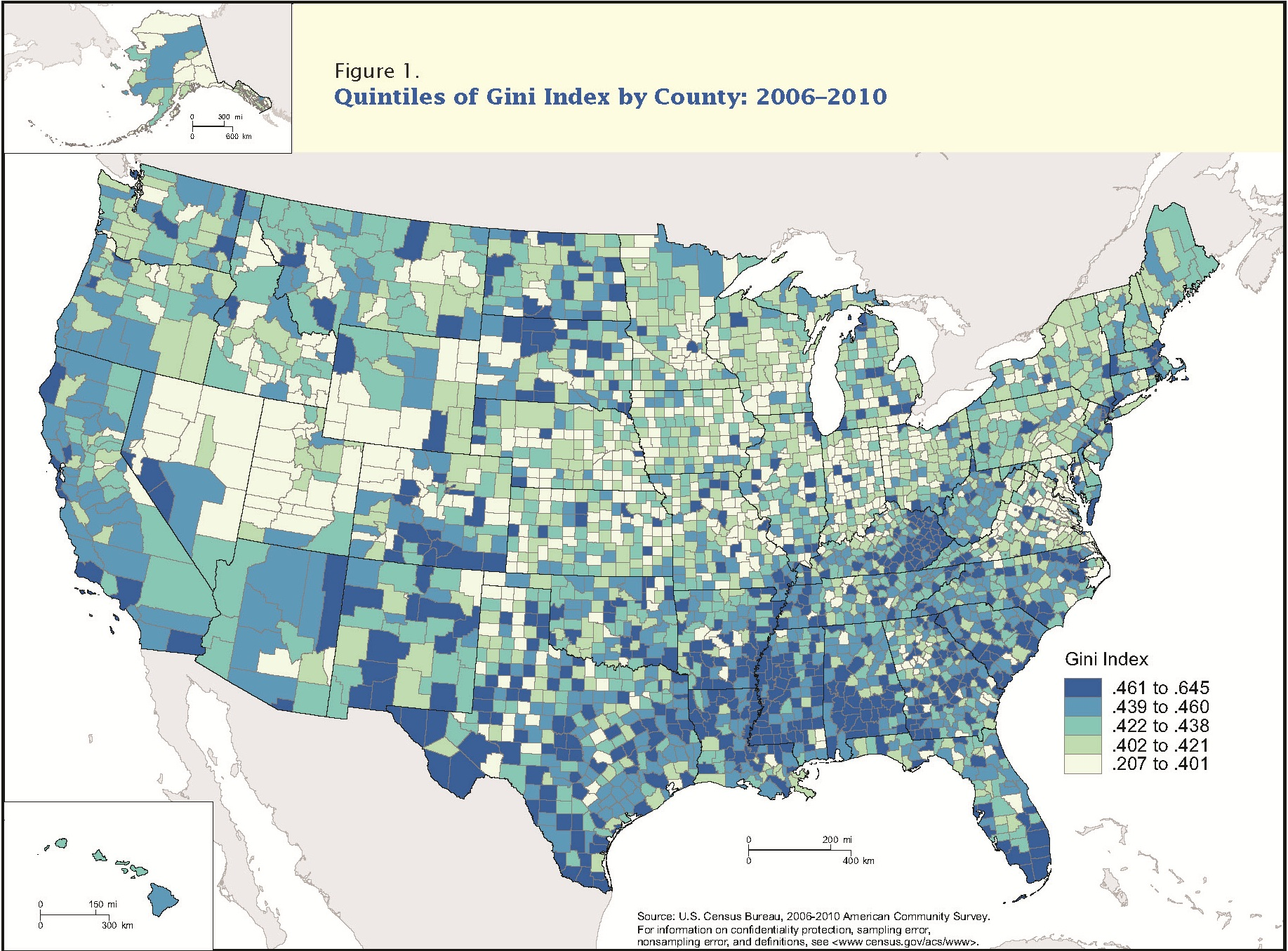
This Gini Index map shows regional and county-level variation in pre-tax income inequality Gini index. The 2010 Gini index value range from 20.7 for Loving County (Texas) to 64.5 to East Carroll Parish (Louisiana).

The US household income Gini of 46.8 in 2009 varied significantly between states: after-tax income inequality in 2009 was greatest in Texas and lowest in Maine. Income inequality grew from 2005 to 2012 in more than 2 out of 3 metropolitan areas.

The states of Utah, Alaska, and Wyoming have a market income Gini coefficient that is 10% lower than the average, while the District of Columbia, and Puerto Rico have a market income Gini coefficient that is 10% higher than the average.

After-tax, the Federal Reserve estimated that 34 US states have a Gini index between 30 and 35, with Maine having the lowest.

At the county and municipality levels, the 2010 market income Gini index ranged from 21 to 65, according to Census Bureau estimates.

Recent Studies on U.S. Metro Areas:

- Eisenbarth, Anthony, Chen, Zhuo Fu. The evolution of wage inequality within local U.S. labor markets. J Labour Market Res 56, 2 (2022). https://doi.org/10.1186/s12651-022-00307-6

== International comparisons ==
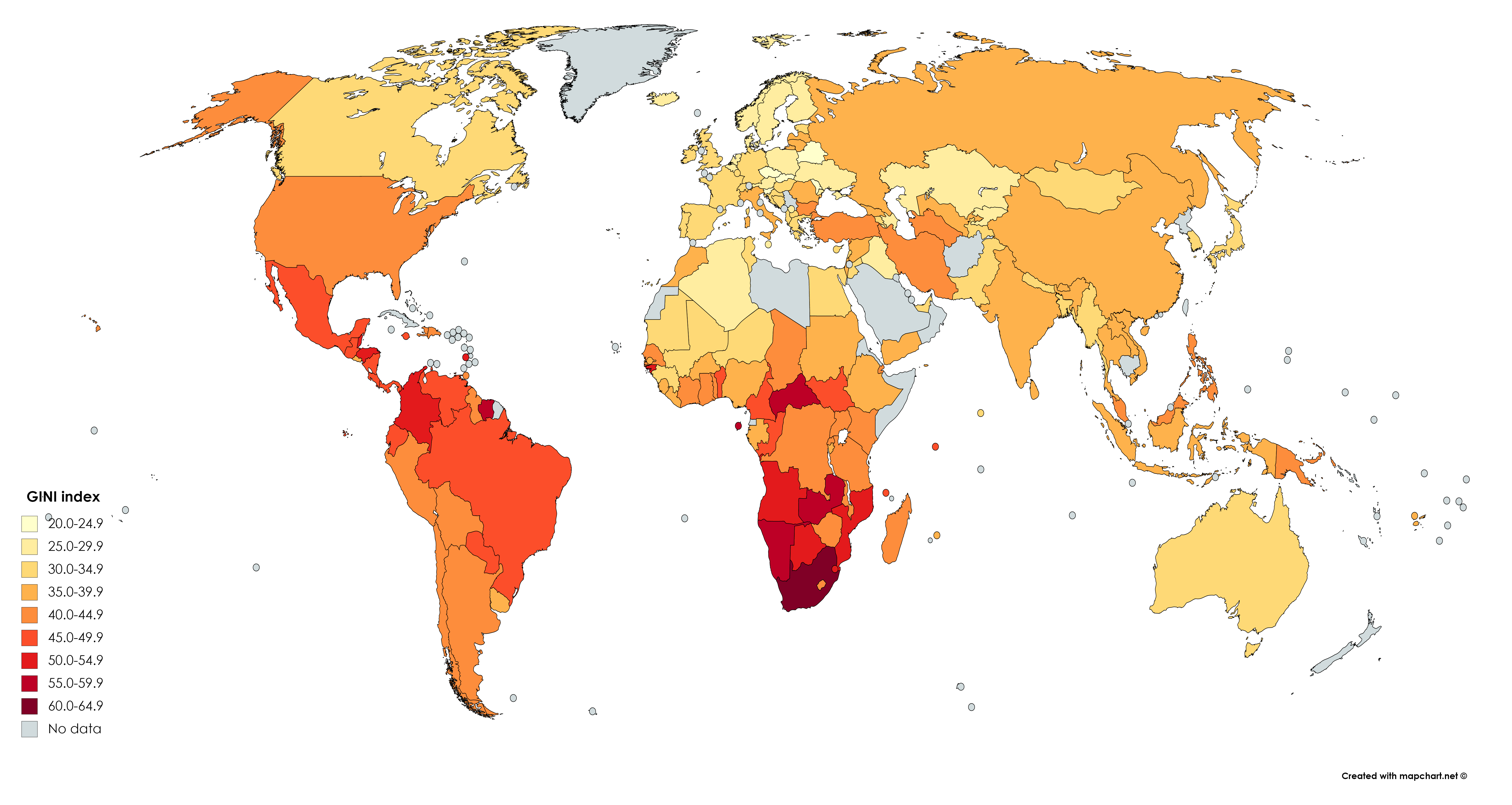
Income gini coefficient map according to the World Bank (2018). Higher Income Gini Index for a nation in this map implies more income inequality among its people.

The United States has the highest level of income inequality in the Western world, according to a 2018 study by the United Nations Special Rapporteur on extreme poverty and human rights. The United States has forty million people living in poverty, and more than half of these people live in "extreme" or "absolute" poverty. Income inequality has increased in recent decades, and large tax cuts that disproportionately favor the very wealthy are predicted to increase U.S. income inequality further.

Actual income inequality and public views about the need to address the issue are directly related in most developed countries, but not in the US, where income inequality is larger, but the concern is lower. Excluding retirees, US market income inequality is comparatively high (rather than moderate), and the level of redistribution is moderate (not low). These comparisons indicate Americans shift from reliance on market income to reliance on income transfers later in life, although less fully than in other developed countries.

International comparisons vary. In 2019 the CIA ranked the US 39th-worst among 157 countries measured by Gini. While inequality increased after 1981 in two-thirds of OECD countries, most are in the more equal end of the spectrum. The European Union measured 30.8.

The US Gini rating (after taxes and transfers) puts it among those of less developed countries. The US is more unequal than or on par with countries such as Mozambique, Peru, Cameroon, Guyana, and Thailand.

Across Europe, the ratio of post-tax income of the top 10% to that of the bottom 50% changed only slightly between the mid-1990s and 2019.

Comparative data are available from databases such as the Luxembourg Income Study (LIS) or the OECD Income Distribution database (OECD IDD), or, when including developing countries, from the World Bank's Povcalnet database, or the World Income Inequality Database (WIID), maintained by the United Nations University World Institute for Development Economics Research (UNU-WIDER), or the World Inequality Database (WID).

=== Reasons for relative performance ===
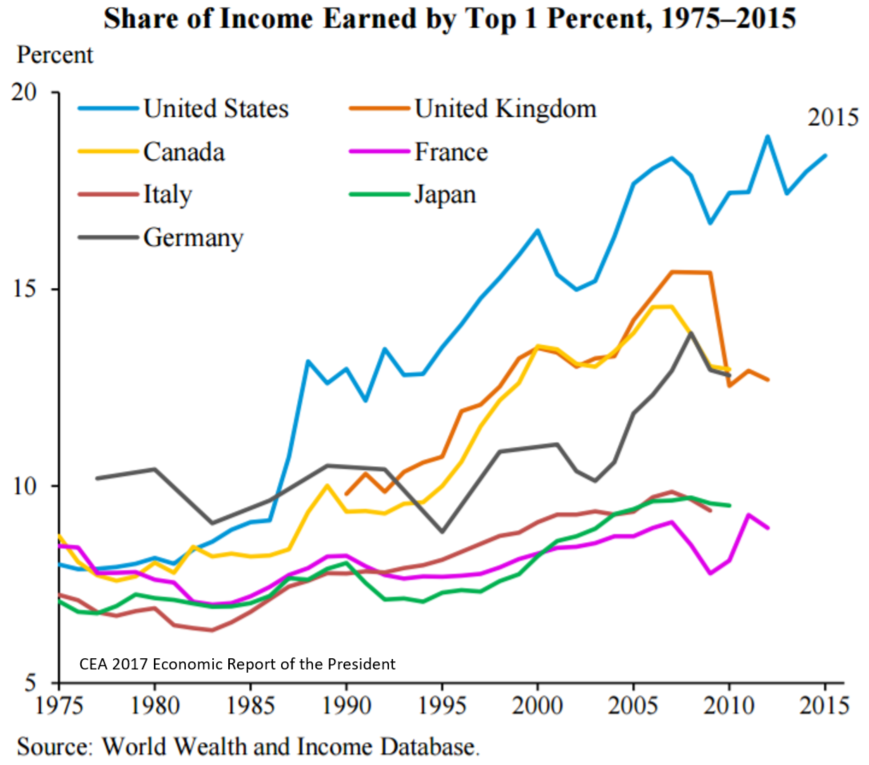
Share of income of the top 1% for selected developed countries, 1975 to 2015

One 2013 study indicated that US market income inequality was comparable to that of other developed countries but was the highest among 22 developed countries after taxes and transfers. This implies that public policy choices, rather than market factors, drive U.S. income inequality disparities relative to other developed nations.

Inequality may be higher than official statistics indicate in some countries because of unreported income. Europeans hold higher amounts of wealth offshore than Americans.

Leonhardt and Quealy, in 2014, described three key reasons why other industrialized countries improved their real median income relative to the US over the 2000-2010 period. In the US:

- educational attainment has risen more slowly;
- companies pay relatively lower wages to the middle class and poor, with top executives making relatively more;
- the government redistributes less from the rich to the poor.

As of 2012, the U.S. had the weakest social safety net among developed nations.

=== 2014 ===
In 2014, Canadian middle-class incomes moved higher than those in the US; in some European nations, citizens received higher raises than their American counterparts. As of that year, only the wealthy had seen pay increases since the Great Recession, while average American workers had not.

== Policy responses ==
Debate continues over whether a public policy response is appropriate to income inequality. For example, Federal Reserve Economist Thomas Garrett wrote in 2010: "It is important to understand that income inequality is a byproduct of a well-functioning capitalist economy. Individuals' earnings are directly related to their productivity ... A wary eye should be cast on policies that aim to shrink the income distribution by redistributing income from the more productive to the less productive simply for the sake of 'fairness.'" Alternatively, bipartisan political majorities have supported redistributive policies such as the EITC.

Economists have proposed various approaches to reducing income inequality. For example, then Federal Reserve Chair Janet Yellen described four "building blocks" in a 2014 speech. These included expanding resources available to children, affordable higher education, business ownership, and inheritance. That year, the Center for American Progress recommended tax reform, further subsidizing healthcare and higher education and strengthening unions as appropriate responses.

Improved infrastructure could address both the causes and the effects of inequality. E.g., workers with limited mobility could use improved mass transit to reach higher-paying jobs further from home and to access beneficial services at lower cost.

Public policy responses addressing effects of income inequality include: tax incidence adjustments and strengthening social safety net provisions such as welfare, food stamps, Social Security, Medicare and Medicaid.

Proposals that address the causes of inequality include education reform and limiting/taxing rent-seeking. Other reforms include raising the minimum wage, tax reform, and increased stock ownership at lower income levels via a deferred investment program.

Surveys of American Economic Association members since the 1970s have shown that professional economists generally agree with the statement that "Redistribution of income is a legitimate role for the U.S. Government", and since the 1990s, that "The distribution of income in the U.S. should be more equal."

=== Education ===
Children from higher-income families often attend higher-quality private schools or are home-schooled. Better teachers raise students' educational attainment and future earnings, but they tend to prefer school districts that educate higher-income children.

=== Parenting assistance ===
Economist Richard V. Reeves and other researchers point out the "parenting gap" between high-income and low-income families. High-income families tend to have the resources to pay for assistance such as child care and tutors, and, having had economically successful ancestors, have culturally inherited the skills needed to raise economically successful children. Based on studies of economic outcomes, Reeves recommends that many governments fund home visiting programs that assist parents in raising healthy children who succeed in school and later obtain better-paying jobs.

=== Healthcare ===
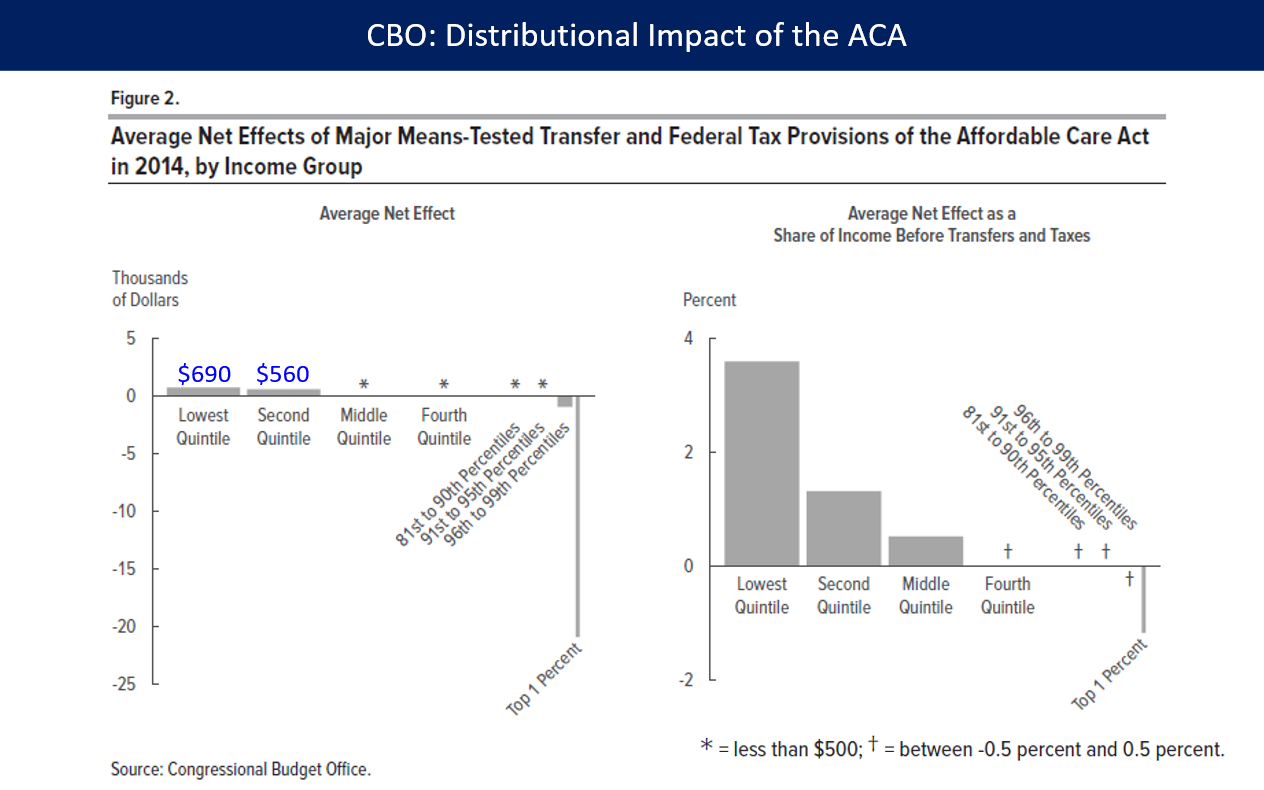
The distributional impact of the Affordable Care Act (ACA or Obamacare) during 2014. The ACA raised taxes mainly on the top 1% to fund approximately $600 in benefits on average for the bottom 40% of families.

Increasing public funding for services such as healthcare can reduce after-tax inequality. The Affordable Care Act reduced income inequality for calendar year 2014:

- "households in the lowest and second quintiles [the bottom 40%] received an average of an additional $690 and $560 respectively, because of the ACA ..."
- "Most of the burden of the ACA fell on households in the top 1% of the income distribution, and relatively little fell on the remainder of households in that quintile. Households in the top 1% paid an additional $21,000, primarily because of the net investment income tax and the additional Medicare tax."

=== Public welfare and infrastructure spending ===
OECD asserted that public spending is vital in reducing the wealth gap. Lane Kenworthy advocates incremental reforms in the direction of the Nordic social democratic model, claiming that this would increase economic security and opportunity.

Eliminating social safety nets can discourage entrepreneurs by exacerbating the consequences of business failure, turning a temporary setback into financial ruin.

=== Taxes ===
Total effective tax rates (includes all taxes: federal+state income tax, sales tax, property tax, etc) for the richest Americans declined by 2018 to a level beneath that of the bottom 50% of earners, contributing to net income inequality. Analysis by economists Emmanuel Saez and Gabriel Zucman.

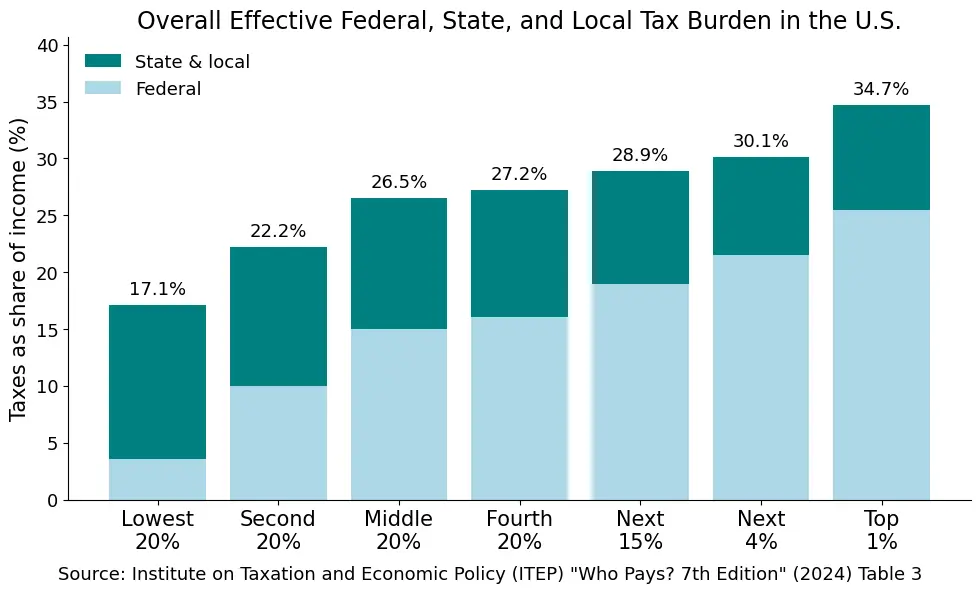
Overall tax burden in the US in 2024

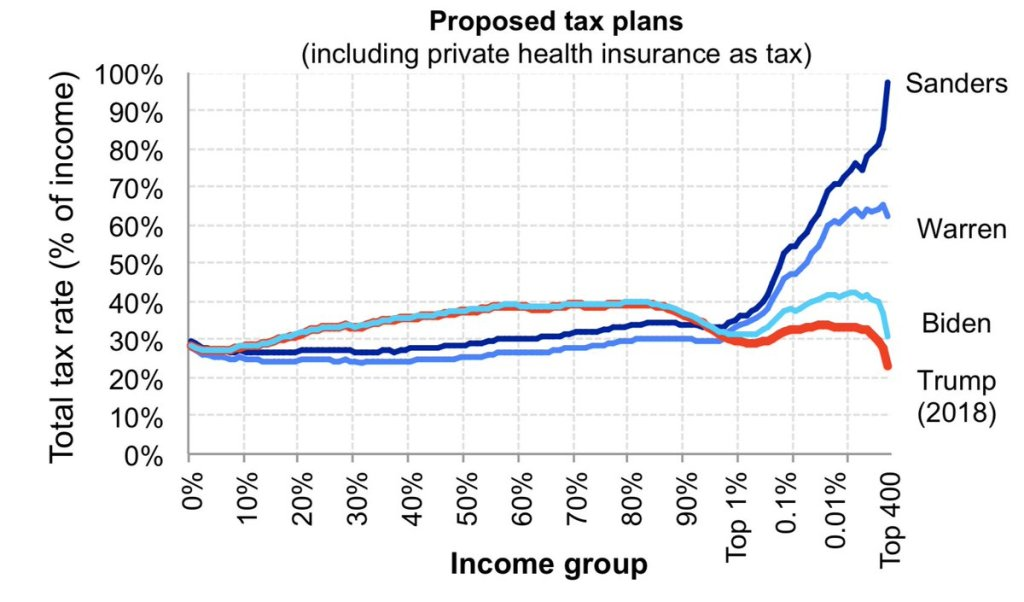
Proposed tax plan payment rates by income group as a percentage of income, including mandatory health insurance, of four 2020 United States presidential election candidates

Income taxes provide one mechanism for addressing after-tax inequality. Increasing the effective progressivity of income taxes reduces the gap between higher and lower incomes. However, taxes paid may not reflect statutory rates because (legal) tax avoidance strategies can offset higher rates.

Piketty called for a 90% wealth tax to address the situation.

==== Tax expenditures ====
Tax expenditures (i.e., exclusions, deductions, preferential tax rates, and tax credits) affect the after-tax income distribution. The benefits of tax expenditures, such as income exclusions for employer-sponsored health insurance premiums and deductions for mortgage interest, are distributed unevenly across the income spectrum.

As of 2019, the US Treasury listed 165 federal income tax expenditures. The largest as employer health insurance deductions, followed by net imputed rental income, capital gains (except agriculture, timber, iron ore, and coal), and defined contribution employer pension plans.

Understanding how each tax expenditure is distributed across the income spectrum can inform policy choices.

A 2019 study by the economists Saez and Zucman found the effective total tax rate (including state and local taxes, and government fees) for the bottom 50% of U.S. households was 24.2% in 2018, whereas for the wealthiest 400 households it was 23%.

=== Corporate taxes ===
Economist Dean Baker argued that corporate income tax policies have multiple effects. Increased corporate profits increase inequality by distributing dividends (mostly to higher-income people). Taxing profits reduces this effect, but it may also reduce investment, thereby reducing employment. It also encourages payers to (often successfully) lobby for increased tax expenditures, which offset the reduction in inequality and push corporations to adjust their behavior to exploit them. Professional lobbying and accounting firms that generally pay well get more business, at the expense of other workers.

=== Minimum wages ===
The Economist states that as inequality rises, political will to help low-paid workers increases, and minimum wages may not be as bad as some believe.

In a blog post on the Economic Policy Institute's site, they say that raising the federal minimum wage to $15 an hour would decrease income inequality.

=== Basic income ===
A public basic income provides each individual with a fixed sum from the government, regardless of age, employment, wealth, or education. People who support basic income as a way to reduce income inequality include the Green Party.

=== Economic democracy ===
Economic democracy is a socioeconomic philosophy that proposes shifting decision-making power from corporations to a broader group of public stakeholders, including workers, customers, suppliers, neighbours, and the broader public.

Economists Richard D. Wolff and Gar Alperovitz claim that such policies would improve equality.

=== Monetary policy ===
Monetary policy is responsible for balancing inflation and unemployment. It can be used to stimulate the economy (e.g., by lowering interest rates, which encourages borrowing and spending, creates additional jobs, and puts upward pressure on inflation) or to tighten it, with the opposite effects. Former Fed Chair Ben Bernanke wrote in 2015 that monetary policy affects income and wealth inequality in multiple ways, but that responsibility lies primarily in other areas:

- Stimulus reduces inequality by creating or preserving jobs, which mainly helps the middle and lower classes who derive more of their income from labor than the wealthy.
- Stimulus inflates the prices of financial assets (owned mainly by the wealthy), but also employment, housing, and the value of small businesses (owned more widely).
- Stimulus increases inflation and/or lowers interest rates, which helps debtors (mainly the middle and lower classes) while hurting creditors (mainly the wealthy), because they are paid back with cheaper dollars or reduced interest.

== Measurement ==
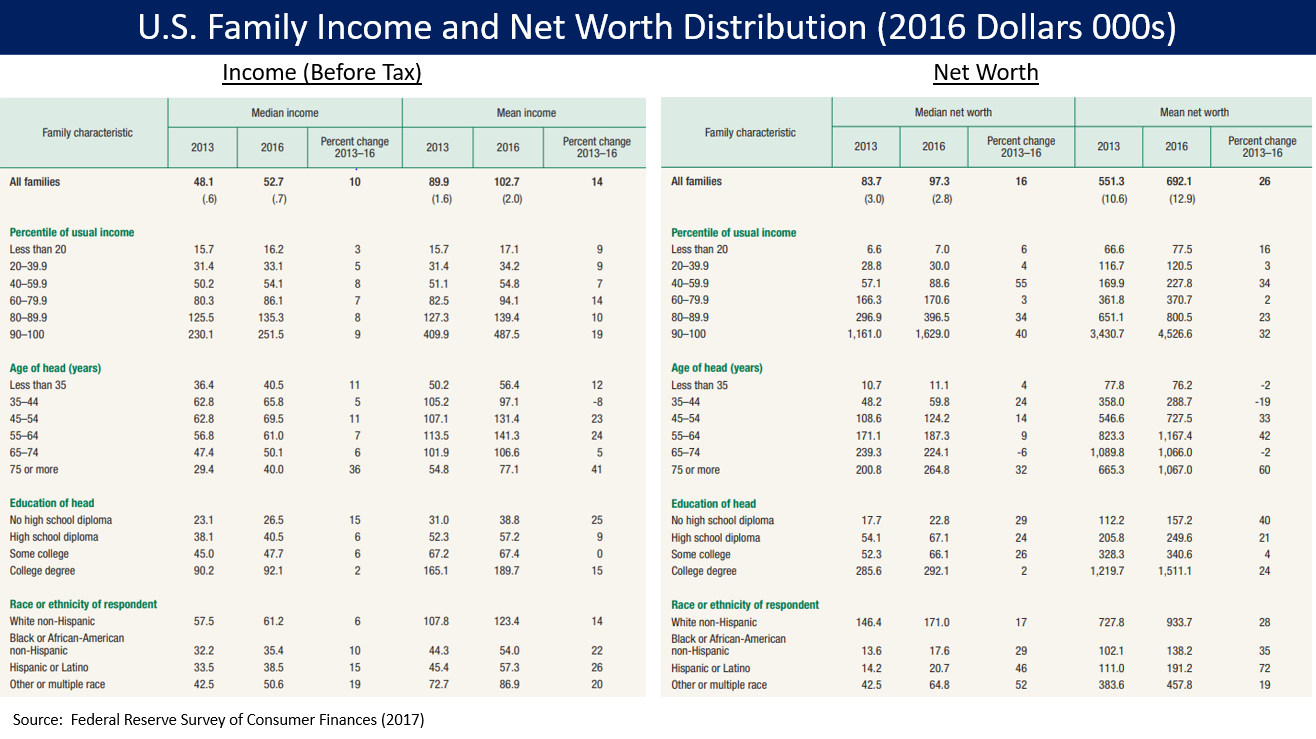
U.S. family pre-tax income and net worth distribution for 2013 and 2016, from the Federal Reserve Survey of Consumer Finances

Various methods measure income inequality. Different sources prefer Gini coefficients or ratio of percentiles, etc. Census Bureau studies on household and individual income show lower levels than some other sources, but do not break out the highest-income households (99%+) where most change has occurred.

One review describes six possible techniques for estimating American real median income growth. Estimates for the 1979-2014 period ranged from a decline of 8% (Piketty and Saez 2003) to an increase of 51% (CBO).

Two commonly cited estimates are the CBO and Emmanuel Saez. These differ in their sources and methods. Using 2011 IRS data, Saez claimed that the share of "market income less transfers" received by the top 1% was about 19.5%. The CBO uses both IRS data and Census data in its computations and reported a lower "pre-tax" figure for the top 1% of 14.6%.

=== Census Bureau data ===
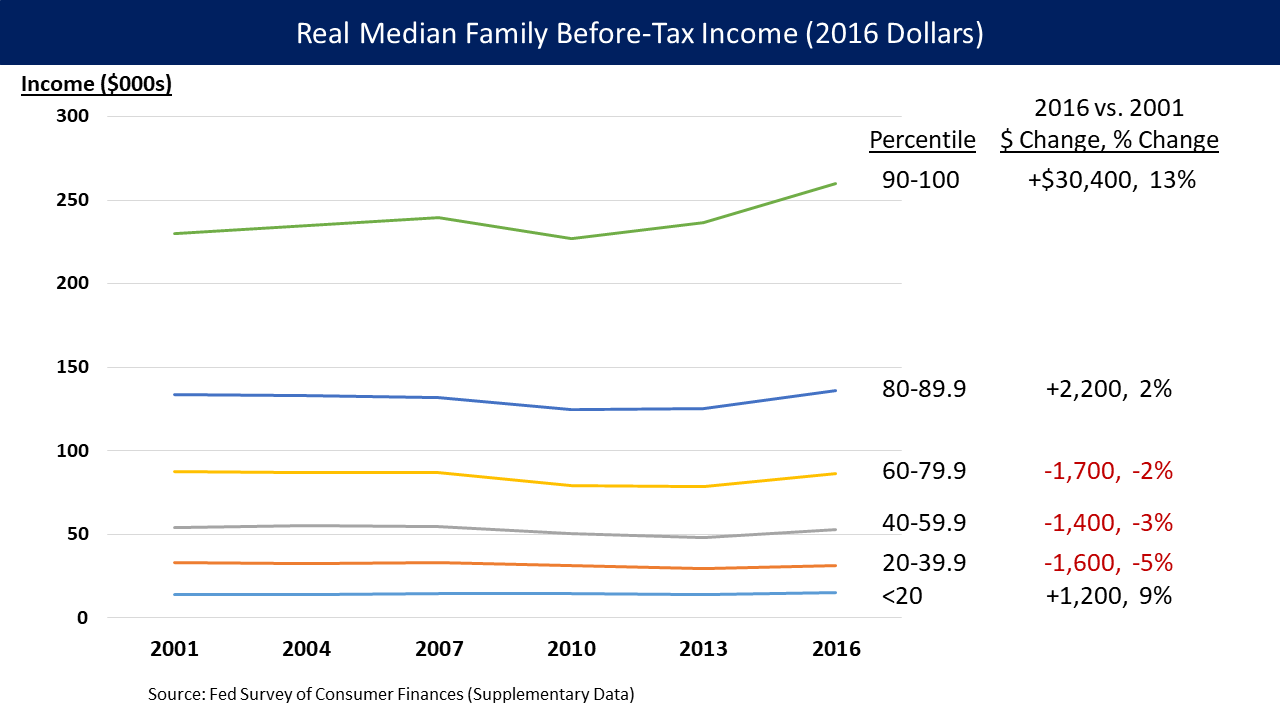
U.S. median family income from 2001 to 2016 (real, measured in 2016 dollars), with comparative statistics, from the Fed Survey of Consumer Finances. The top decile and bottom quintile had real increases in income comparing 2001 and 2016, while the 20th to 80th percentiles had decreases. For all families, the median was $54,100 in 2001 and $52,700 in 2016, a slight decline. Note this differs from real median household income, which hit a record level in 2016.

The Census Bureau ranks all households by household income based on its surveys and then divides them into quintiles. The highest-ranked household in each quintile provides the upper income limit for that quintile. Census data reflects market income without adjustments, and is not amenable to adjustment for taxes and transfers. Because census data do not capture changes within individual households, they are not suitable for studying income mobility.

A major gap in the measurement of income inequality is the exclusion of capital gains, profits made on increases in the value of investments. Capital gains are excluded for purely practical reasons. The Census doesn't ask about them, so they can't be included in inequality statistics. Obviously, the rich earn much more from investments than the poor. As a result, real levels of income inequality in America are much higher than the official Census Bureau figures would suggest.

— Salvatore Babones

Gary Burtless noted that for this reason census data overstated the income losses that middle-income families suffered in the Great Recession.

=== Internal Revenue Service data ===
Saez and Piketty pioneered the use of IRS data to analyze income distribution in 1998.

=== GDP distribution ===
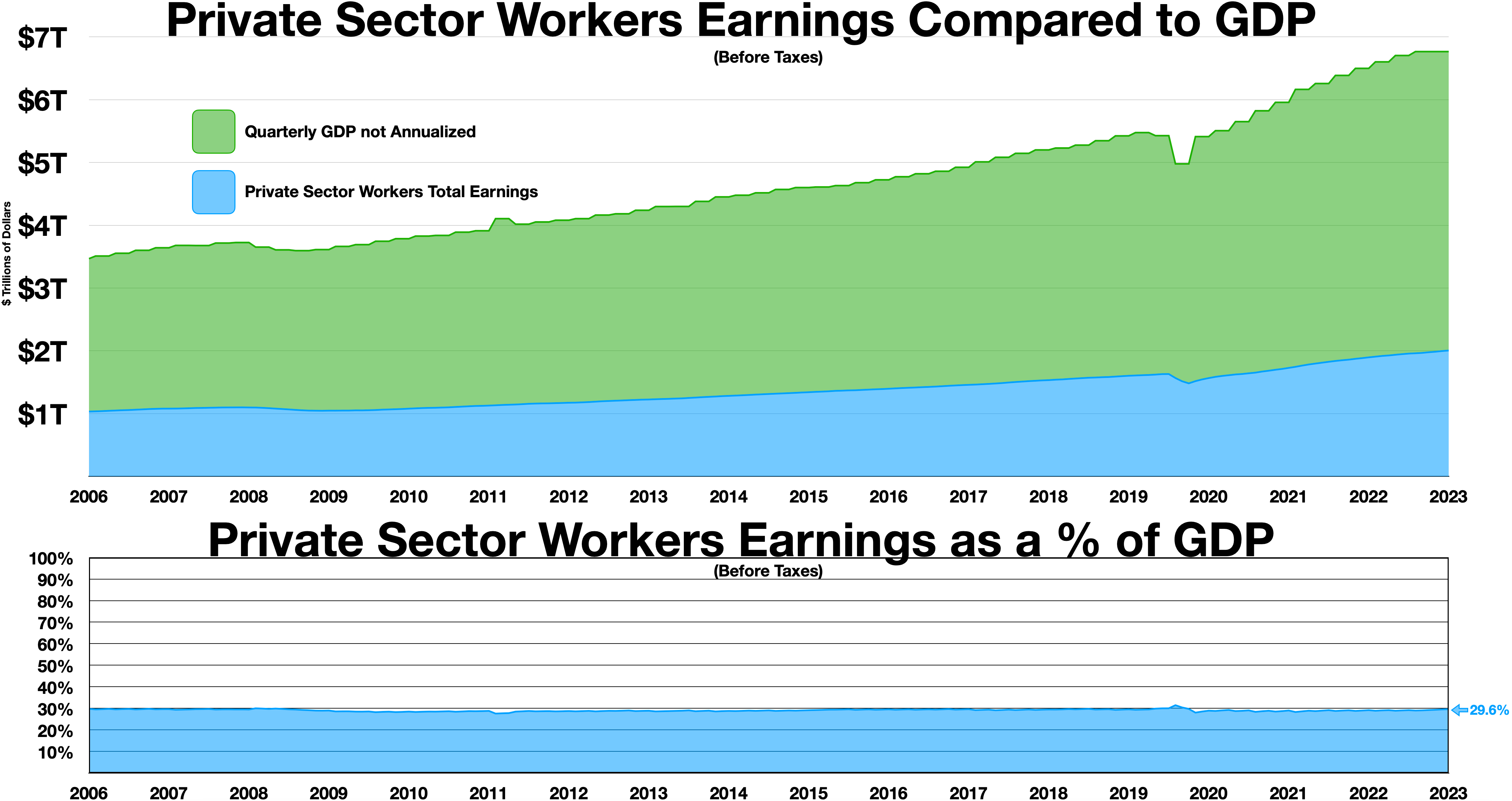
Private sector workers earnings compared to GDP Private sector workers made ~$2 trillion or about 29.6% of all money earned in Q3 2023 (before taxes) Quarterly GDP not Annualized Private Sector Workers Total Earnings

Another approach attempts to allocate GDP to individuals, to compensate for the 40% of GDP that does not appear on tax returns. One source of the disagreement is the growth of tax-free retirement accounts, such as pension funds, IRAs, and 401Ks. Another source is tax evasion, whose distribution is also disputed.

=== Income measures: pre-and post-tax ===
Inequality can be measured before and after the effects of taxes and transfer payments, such as social security and unemployment insurance.

Measuring inequality after accounting for taxes and transfers reduces observed inequality, because both the income tax system and transfer systems are designed to do so. The impacts of those policies vary as the policy regime changes. CBO reported in 2011 that: "The equalizing effect of transfers declined over the 1979–2007 period primarily because the distribution of transfers became less progressive. The equalizing effect of federal taxes also declined over the period, in part because the amount of federal taxes shrank as a share of market income and in part because of changes in the progressivity of the federal tax system."

CBO income statistics show the growing importance of these items. In 1980, in-kind benefits and employer and government spending on health insurance accounted for just 6% of the after-tax incomes of households in the middle one-fifth of the distribution. By 2010, these in-kind income sources represented 17% of middle-class households' after-tax income. Post-tax income items are increasing faster than pre-tax items. As a result of these programs, the spendable incomes of poor and middle-class families have been better insulated against recession-driven losses than the incomes of Americans in the top 1%. Incomes in the middle and at the bottom of the distribution have fared better since 2000 than incomes at the very top.

Continuing increases in transfers, e.g., resulting from the Affordable Care Act, reduced inequality, while tax changes in the Tax Cuts and Jobs Act of 2017 had the opposite effect.

CBO incorporates capital gains.

=== Demographic issues ===
Comparisons of household income over time should control for changes in average age, family size, number of breadwinners, and other characteristics. Measuring personal income ignores dependent children, but household income also has problems – a household of ten has a lower standard of living than one of two people, though their incomes may be the same. People's earnings tend to rise over their working lifetimes, so point-in-time estimates can be misleading. (A world in which each person received a lifetime of income on their 21st birthday and no income thereafter would have an extremely high Gini, even if everyone received the same amount. Real-world incomes also tend to be spiky, although not to that extreme.) Some 11% of households eventually appear in the 1% at some point. The inequality between a recent college graduate and a 55-year-old at the peak of their career is not an issue if the graduate has the same career path.

Conservative researchers and organizations have focused on the limitations of household income as a measure of the standard of living to refute claims that income inequality is growing, excessive, or a problem.

According to a 2004 analysis of income quintile data by The Heritage Foundation, inequality is less after adjusting for household size. The aggregate share of income held by the upper quintile (the top-earning 20 percent) decreases by 20.3% when figures are adjusted for household size.

However, the Pew Research Center found that household income declined less than individual income in the twenty-first century because those who could no longer afford separate housing moved in with relatives, creating larger households with more earners. A 2011 CBO study adjusted for household size so that its quintiles contain an equal number of people, not an equal number of households. CBO found income distribution over a multi-year period "modestly" more equal than annual income, confirming earlier studies.

According to Noah, adjusting for demographic factors such as increasing age and smaller households indicates that income inequality is less extreme but growing faster than it would be without the adjustment.

=== Gini index ===
The Gini coefficient was developed by Italian statistician and sociologist Corrado Gini and published in his 1912 paper Variability and Mutability (Italian: Variabilità e mutabilità).

Gini ratings can be used to compare inequality (by race, gender, and employment) within and between jurisdictions, using a variety of income measures and data sources, with differing results. For example, the Census Bureau's official market Gini for the US was 47.6 in 2013, up from 45.4 in 1993. By contrast, OECD's US adjusted compensation Gini was 37 in 2012.

=== Consumer spending ===
In 2024, the top 10% of earners (over $250,000) accounted for about half (49.7%) of US consumer spending.

== Other indicators of inequality ==
Income, however measured, is only one indicator of equality. Others include equality of opportunity, consumption, and wealth.

=== Opportunity ===
Economist Thomas Sowell, and former Congressman and Speaker of the House Paul Ryan argued that more important than equality of results is equality of opportunity. This measures the degree to which individuals have the chance to succeed, despite their original circumstances.

Economic connectedness, or the extent to which individuals form social relationships across socioeconomic lines, has been identified as a significant factor in economic mobility. Research from the American Academy of Arts and Sciences highlights how communities with greater cross-class interaction tend to exhibit higher levels of upward mobility, as these social connections provide access to job opportunities, educational resources, and economic knowledge. Studies analyzing large-scale data have demonstrated that low-income individuals with more high-income connections are more likely to experience economic advancement. This research suggests that, beyond traditional measures such as income distribution and wealth concentration, disparities in social capital contribute to broader patterns of inequality in the United States.

=== Consumption ===
Other researchers argued that income is less important than consumption. Two individuals (or other units) who consume the same amount have similar outcomes despite differences in their incomes. Consumption inequality is also less extreme. Will Wilkinson wrote, "the run-up in consumption inequality has been considerably less dramatic than the rise in income inequality". According to Johnson, Smeeding, and Tory, consumption inequality was lower in 2001 than in 1986. Other studies have not found consumption inequality less dramatic than household income inequality. A CBO study found consumption data not capturing consumption by high-income households as well as it does their incomes, though it found that household consumption numbers are less unequal than household income.

Others dispute the importance of consumption, pointing out that if middle- and lower-income households are consuming more than they earn, it is because they are saving less or going further into debt. Alternatively, higher-income persons may be consuming less than their income, saving/investing the balance.

=== Wealth ===
Net personal wealth in the U.S. since 1962

The average personal wealth of people in the top 1% is more than a thousand times that of people in the bottom 50%.

The logarithmic scale shows how wealth has increased for all percentile groups, though moreso for wealthier people.

Wealth inequality refers to the distribution of net worth (i.e., what is owned minus what is owed) as opposed to annual income. Wealth is affected by movements in the prices of assets, such as stocks, bonds, and real estate, which fluctuate in the short term. Income inequality has significant effects on long-term shifts in wealth inequality. Wealth inequality is increasing:

- The top .1% owned approximately 22% of the wealth in 2012, versus 7% in 1978. The top 1% share of wealth was at or below 10% from 1950 to 1987. A conflicting estimate found that they held some 15%.
- The top 400 Americans had a net worth of $2 trillion in 2013, more than the bottom 50%. Their average net worth was $5 billion.
- The lower 50% of households held 3% of the wealth in 1989 and 1% in 2013. Their average net worth in 2013 was approximately $11,000.
- The threshold for the wealthiest 1% was approximately $8.4 million, measured for the 2008–2010 period. Nearly half the top 1% by income were also in the top 1% by wealth. In 2010, the wealthiest 5% of households owned approximately 72% of financial wealth, while the bottom 80% of households had 5%.
- The top 1% controlled 38.6% of the country's wealth in 2016.

Much of the wealth gain came to those in the top 1%. Those between the top 1 percent and top 5 percent controlled a smaller percentage of wealth than before.

=== Education and family structure ===
Ivy-Plus university admissions rates vary with the income of the students' parents, with the acceptance rate of the top 0.1% income percentile being almost twice as much as other students.

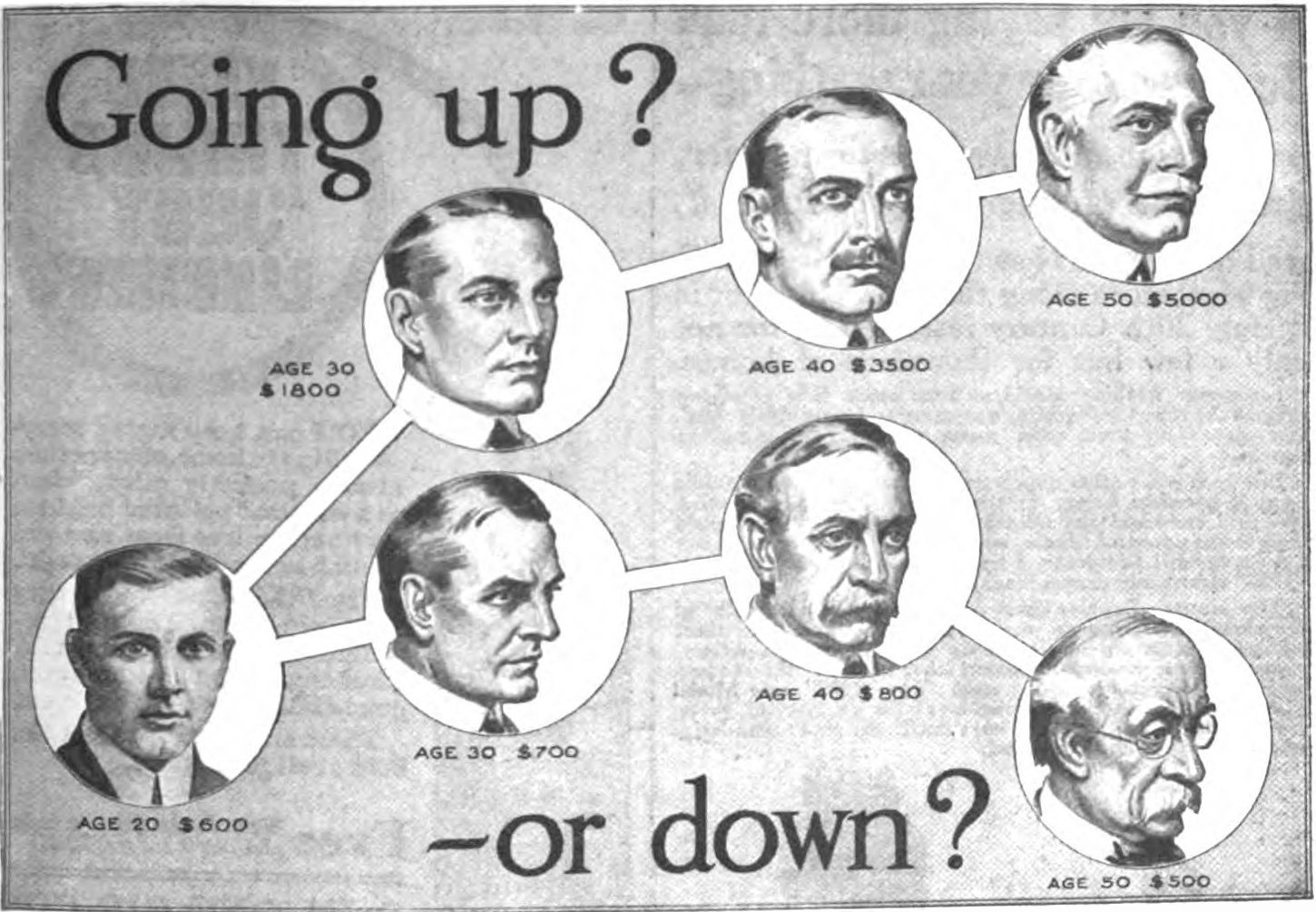
A 1916 ad for a vocational school appealed to Americans' belief in the possibility of self-betterment, as well as threatening economic insecurity through lack of education.

Another form of inequality is the different level and quality of education available to students. School quality and educational outcomes vary dramatically depending on whether a student attends a private school, a charter school, or an effective public school. Many students have no choice but to attend dysfunctional public schools, where fewer achieve grade level performance.

Pundit David Brooks argued that in the 1970s, high school and college graduates had "very similar family structures", while later high school grads were much less likely to get married, and much more likely to smoke, be obese, get divorced, and/or become a single parent. "The zooming wealth of the top one percent is a problem, but it's not nearly as big a problem as the tens of millions of Americans who have dropped out of high school or college. It's not nearly as big a problem as the 40 percent of children who are born out of wedlock. It's not nearly as big a problem as the nation's stagnant human capital, its stagnant social mobility and the disorganized social fabric for the bottom 50 percent."

=== Hollowing out of the Middle Class ===
Hollowing out of the middle class refers to its loss in income share beginning with Reaganomics. The middle class is defined as the middle 20% of the income distribution, i.e., those between the 40th and 60th percentile. In 1980, the middle class earned 17% of total income in the United States. However, by 2019 its share decreased to 14%, a drop of 3%. Another way to see this is that in 1980, the share of the middle class was the same as that of the top 5%, but by 2019, the top 5% was 9 percentage points ahead of the middle class.

== Opinions of notable individuals ==
Although some spoke out in favor of moderate inequality as a form of incentive, others warned against excessive levels of inequality, including Robert J. Shiller, (who called rising economic inequality "the most important problem that we are facing now today"), former Federal Reserve Board chairman Alan Greenspan, ("This is not the type of thing which a democratic society – a capitalist democratic society – can really accept without addressing"), and President Barack Obama (who referred to the widening income gap as the "defining challenge of our time").

United Nations special rapporteur Philip Alston, following a fact-finding mission to the United States in December 2017, said in his report that "the United States already leads the developed world in income and wealth inequality, and it is now moving full steam ahead to make itself even more unequal."

Alan Krueger summarized research studies in 2012, stating that as income inequality increases:

- Income shifts to the wealthy, who tend to consume less of each marginal dollar, slowing consumption and therefore economic growth;
- Income mobility falls: parents' income better predicts their children's income;
- Middle and lower-income families borrow more to maintain their consumption, a contributing factor to financial crises; and
- The wealthy gain more political power, which results in policies that further slow economic growth.

Many economists claim that America's growing income inequality is "deeply worrying", unjust, a danger to democracy/social stability, or a sign of national decline. Nobelist Robert Shiller after receiving the award stated, "The most important problem that we are facing now today, I think, is rising inequality in the United States and elsewhere in the world." Piketty warned, "The egalitarian pioneer ideal has faded into oblivion, and the New World may be on the verge of becoming the Old Europe of the twenty-first century's globalized economy." Angus Deaton asserts that the prevailing orthodoxy which promotes the idea of unfettered free markets and limited government intervention helped to establish a predatory capitalist system in the US that enriches corporations and the wealthy at the expense of the working class.

Others claim that the increase is not significant, that America's economic growth and/or equality of opportunity should be the primary focus, that rising inequaity is a global phenomenon that would be foolish to try to change through US domestic policy, that it "has many economic benefits and is the result of ... a well-functioning economy", and has or may become an excuse for "class-warfare rhetoric". They argue against "redistribution of wealth", instead advocating for "sound economic policy to reduce poverty [which] would lift people out of poverty (increase their productivity) while not reducing the well-being of wealthier individuals".

== See also ==
- American Dream
- Criticism of credit scoring systems in the United States
- Economic history of the United States
- Economic inequality
- Economic mobility
- Economic stagnation
- Economy of the United States
- Educational attainment in the United States
- The End of Work
- High-net-worth individual
- Homelessness in the United States
- Inequality for All – 2013 documentary film presented by Robert Reich
- Income distribution
- Income inequality metrics
  - Atkinson index
  - Gini coefficient
  - Hoover index
  - Pareto distribution#Occurrence and applications
  - Theil index
- Legatum Prosperity Index
- List of countries by income equality
- List of countries by inequality-adjusted HDI
- Median income
- Middle-class squeeze
- Occupy Movement
- Racial inequality in the United States
- Racism in the United States
- Second Bill of Rights
- Socialism for the rich and capitalism for the poor
- Socio-economic mobility in the United States
- The Divide: American Injustice in the Age of the Wealth Gap – book
- The Spirit Level: Why More Equal Societies Almost Always Do Better – book
- Social justice
- Tax policy and economic inequality in the United States
- Wealth inequality in the United States
