= Wealth inequality in the United States =

1989 Q3 to 2026 Q1. In recent decades, US wealth has become increasingly concentrated in the wealthiest one percent of the population.

Wealth inequality in the US over time. Via the Gini coefficient.

The inequality of wealth (i.e., inequality in the distribution of assets) has substantially increased in the United States since the late 1980s. Wealth commonly includes the values of any homes, automobiles, personal valuables, businesses, savings, and investments, less any associated debts.

Although different from income inequality, the two are related. Wealth is usually not used for daily expenditures or factored into household budgets. However, combined with income, it represents a family's total opportunity to secure stature and a meaningful standard of living, or to pass their class status down to their children. Moreover, wealth provides for both short- and long-term financial security, bestows social prestige, contributes to political power, and can be leveraged to obtain more wealth. Hence, wealth provides mobility and agency—the ability to act. Accumulating wealth enables a variety of freedoms and removes limits on life that one might otherwise face.

Federal Reserve data indicates that as of Q2 2026, the top 1% of households in the United States held 32.5% of the country's wealth, while the bottom 50% held 2.3%. In 2026 Q2 the top 10% owned 88.1% of US stocks.

From 1989 to 2019, wealth became increasingly concentrated in the top 1% and top 10%, largely because of concentrated corporate stock ownership among them; the bottom 50% own little or no corporate stock. From an international perspective, in the US the mean wealth per adult is over 600% of the median. A 2011 study found that US citizens across the political spectrum dramatically underestimate wealth inequality in the US and would prefer a more egalitarian distribution of wealth.

During the COVID-19 pandemic, billionaires' wealth increased by 70%, with 2020 marking the steepest recorded increase in their share of wealth to that year.

== Statistics ==
The top one percent of the US population jumped from owning 22.8% of all US household wealth in 1989 to 32.5% in 2026 Q2.

Note US wealth concentration (green) 1989 Q3 to 2026 Q2.

Wealth percentile band from 1989 Q3 to 2026 Q2
Wealth percentile band	Wealth	
Wealth percentile band	1989	2026
Top 0.1%	8.6%	15.0%
99-99.9%	14.2%	17.5%
90-99%	38.0%	36.4%
50-90%	35.7%	28.8%

Top cumulative wealth from 1989 Q3 to 2026 Q2
Cumulative from top	Wealth	
Cumulative from top	1989	2026
Top 0.1%	8.6%	15.0%
Top 1%	22.8%	32.5%
Top 10%	60.8%	68.9%
Top 50%	96.5%	97.7%

Bottom cumulative wealth from 1989 Q3 to 2026 Q2
Cumulative from bottom	Wealth	
Cumulative from bottom	1989	2026
Bottom 99.9%	91.4%	85.0%
Bottom 99%	77.2%	67.5%
Bottom 90%	39.2%	31.1%
Bottom 50%	3.5%	2.3%

Wealth share of the richest 1 percent. From Our World in Data. Fully interactive. US is 27th out of 200 countries in its percent of household wealth owned by the top 1%. A higher wealth share correlates with a higher Gini number, and more wealth inequality.

Net personal wealth in the U.S. since 1962

The average personal wealth of people in the top 1% is more than a thousand times that of people in the bottom 50%.

The logarithmic scale shows how wealth has increased for all percentile groups, though moreso for wealthier people.

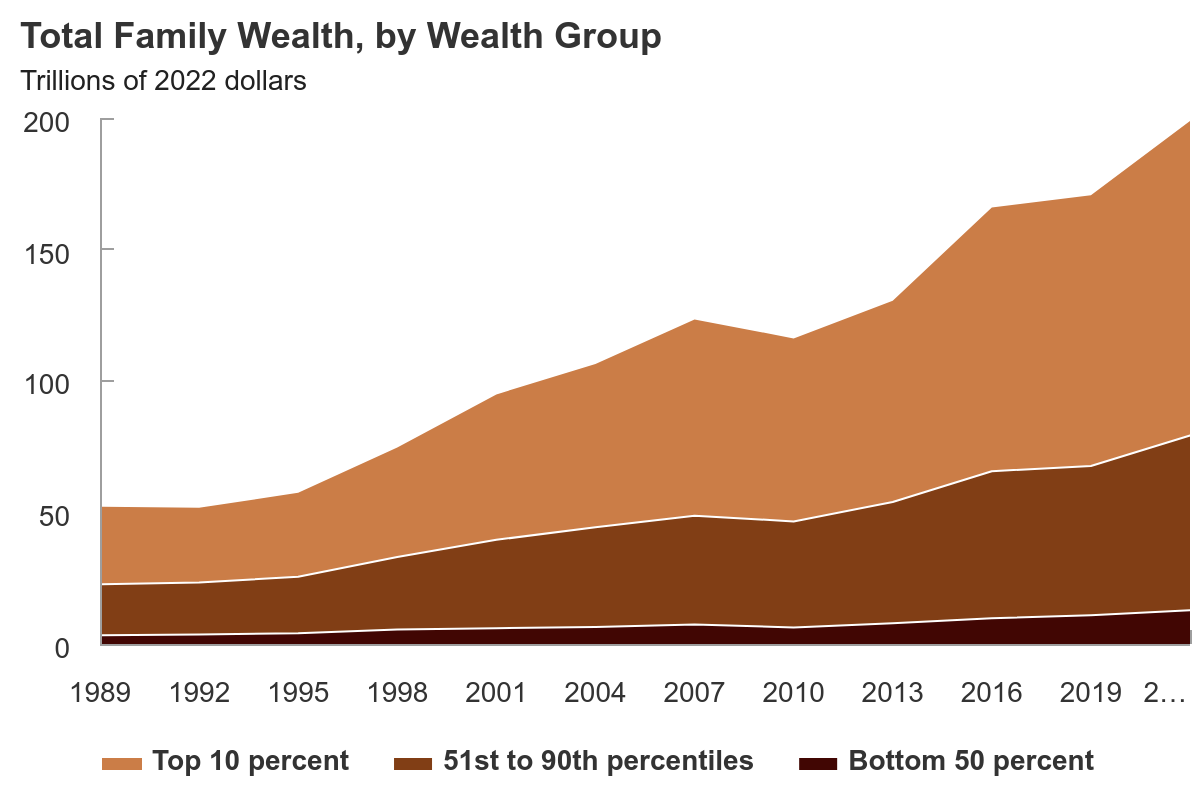
Trends in the distribution of family wealth, 1989 to 2022. Congressional Budget Office.

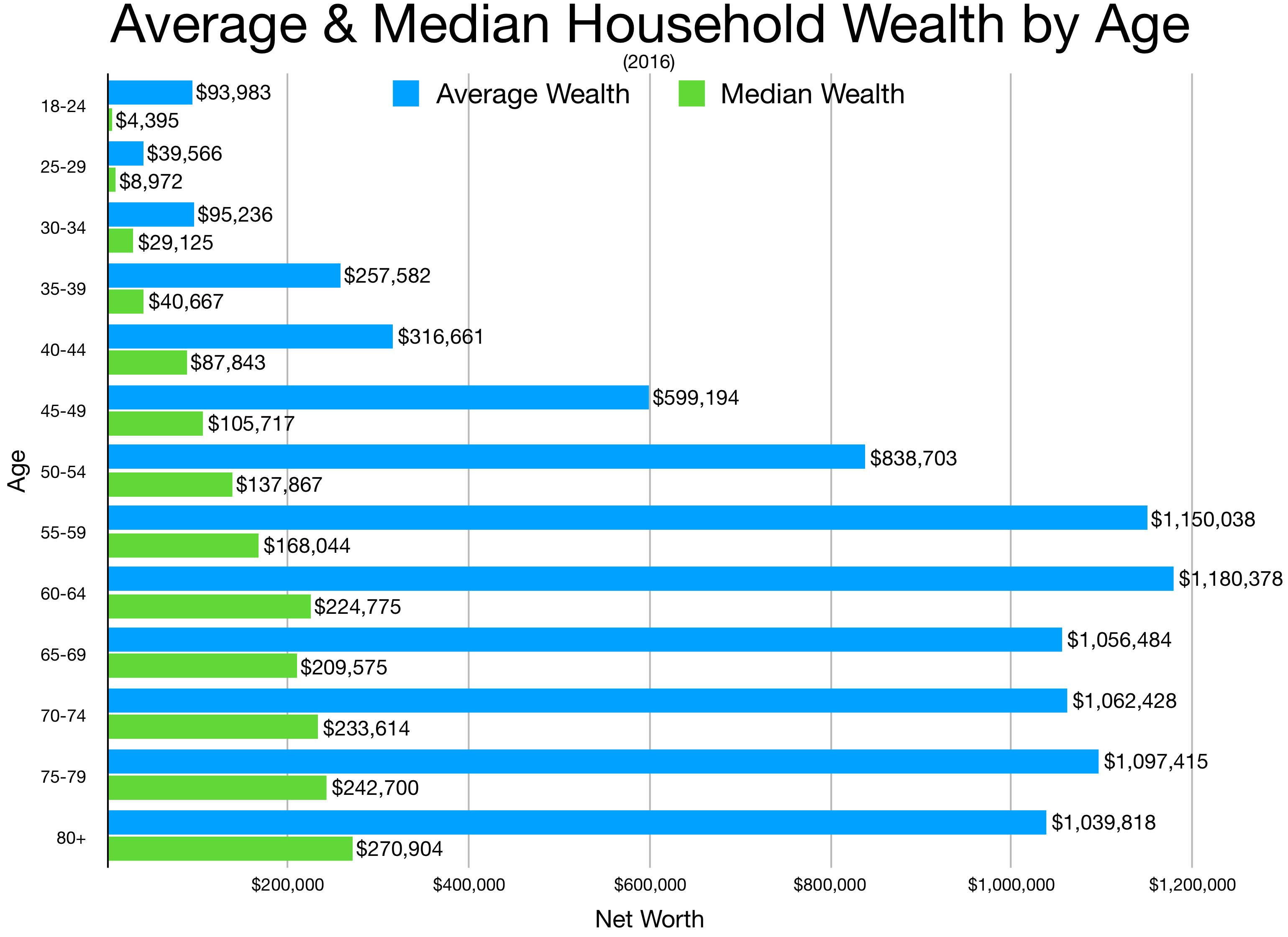
Average and median household wealth by age group

According to PolitiFact and other sources, in 2011, the 400 wealthiest Americans had more wealth than half of all Americans combined. Inherited wealth may help explain why many Americans who have become rich may have had a substantial head start. In September 2012, according to the Institute for Policy Studies, over 60 percent of the Forbes richest 400 Americans grew up in substantial privilege.

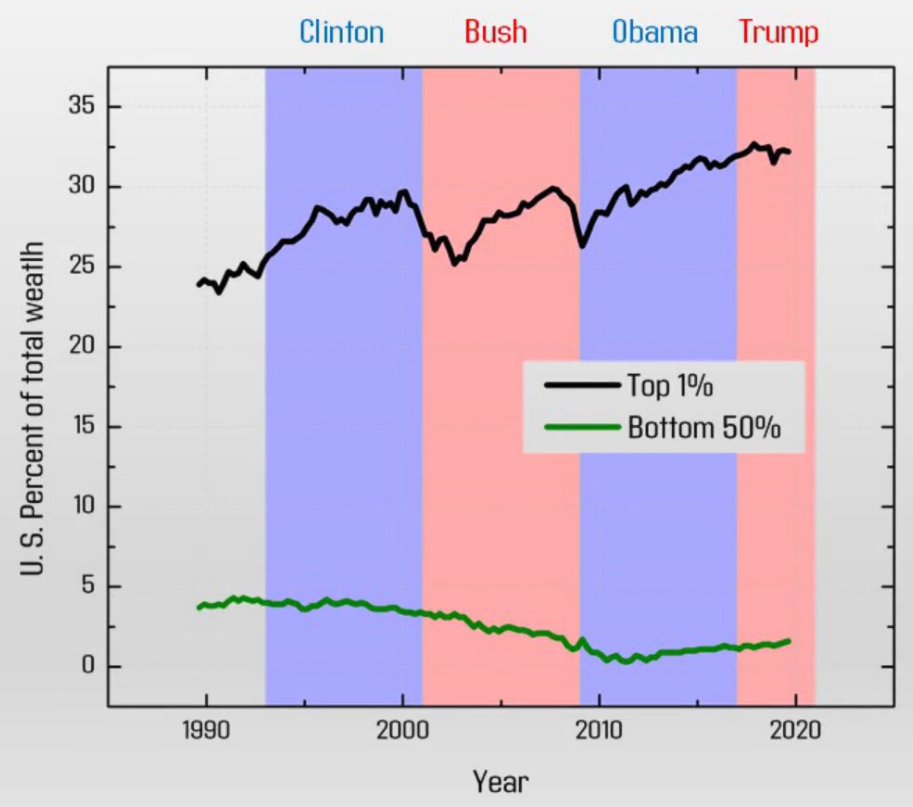
Distribution of household wealth for the Top 1% and Bottom 50% in the U.S. since 1989

In the United States, the use of offshore holdings is exceptionally small compared to Europe, where much of the wealth of the top percentiles is kept in offshore holdings. According to a 2014 Credit Suisse study, the ratio of wealth to household income is the highest it has been since the Great Depression.

According to a paper published by the Federal Reserve in 1997, "For most households, pensions and Social Security are the most important sources of income during retirement, and the promised benefit stream constitutes a sizable fraction of household wealth" and "including pensions and Social Security in net worth makes the distribution more even."

In Inequality for All—a 2013 documentary, narrated by Robert Reich, in which he argues that income inequality is the defining issue of the United States—Reich states that 95% of economic gains following the economic recovery which began in 2009 went to the top 1% of Americans (by net worth) (HNWI).

According to a June 2017 report by the Boston Consulting Group, around 70% of the nation's wealth will be in the hands of millionaires and billionaires by 2021.

A 2019 study by economists Emmanuel Saez and Gabriel Zucman found that the average effective tax rate paid by the richest 400 families (0.003%) in the US was 23 percent, more than a percentage point lower than the 24.2 percent paid by the bottom half of American households. The Urban-Brookings Tax Policy Center found that the bottom 20 percent of earners pay an average 2.9 percent effective income tax rate federally, while the richest 1 percent paid an effective 29.6 percent tax rate and the top 0.01 percent paid an effective 30.6 percent tax rate. In 2019, the Institute on Taxation and Economic Policy found that when state and federal taxes are taken into account, however, the poorest 20 percent pay an effective 20.2 percent rate while the top 1 percent pay an effective 33.7 percent rate.

Using Federal Reserve data, the Washington Center for Equitable Growth reported in August 2019 that: "Looking at the cumulative growth of wealth disaggregated by group, we see that the bottom 50 percent of wealth owners experienced no net wealth growth since 1989. At the other end of the spectrum, the top 1 percent have seen their wealth grow by almost 300 percent since 1989. Although cumulative wealth growth was relatively similar among all wealth groups through the 1990s, the top 1 percent and bottom 50 percent diverged around 2000."

According to an analysis of Survey of Consumer Finances data from 2019 by the People's Policy Project, 79% of the country's wealth is owned by millionaires and billionaires.

Also in 2019, PolitiFact reported that three people (fewer than the 400 reported in 2011) had more wealth than the bottom half of all Americans.

During the COVID-19 pandemic, the wealth held by billionaires in the U.S. increased by 70%. According to the 2022 World Inequality Report, "2020 marked the steepest increase in global billionaires' share of wealth on record."

As of late 2022, according to Snopes, 735 billionaires collectively possessed more wealth than the bottom half of U.S. households ($4.5 trillion and $4.1 trillion, respectively). The top 1% held a total of $43.45 trillion.

=== Late 18th century ===
A 2026 study in the The Quarterly Journal of Economics found that "spatial inequality in the United States has been large and highly persistent since the mid-1800s."

In the late 18th century, "incomes were more equally distributed in colonial America than in any other place that can be measured," according to Peter Lindert and Jeffrey Williamson. The richest 1 percent of households held only 8.5% of total income in the late 18th century. The Gini coefficient, which measures inequality on a scale from 0 to 1 (with 1 indicating very high inequality), was 0.367 in New England and the Middle Atlantic, compared with 0.57 in Europe. Some reasons for this include the ease with which the average American could buy frontier land, which was abundant at the time, and an overall scarcity of labor in non-slaveholding areas, which forced landowners to pay higher wages. There were also relatively few poor people in America at the time, since only those with at least some money could afford to come.

=== 19th century ===
Inequality grew in the 19th century; between 1774 and 1860, the Gini coefficient grew from 0.441 to 0.529. In 1860, the top 1 percent collected almost one-third of property incomes, as compared to 13.7% in 1774. There was intense competition for land in cities and non-frontier areas during this period, with those who had already acquired land becoming richer than everyone else. The burgeoning financial sector also greatly rewarded the already wealthy, as they were the only ones financially sound enough to invest.

=== Early 20th century ===
Simon Kuznets, using income tax records and his research-based estimates, showed a reduction of about 10% in the share of national income going to the top 10% of wealth owners, from about 45–50% in 1913 to about 30–35% in 1948. This period spans both The Great Depression and World War II, events with significant economic consequences. This is called the Great Compression. Franklin D. Roosevelt's establishment of social programs under the New Deal and efforts towards wealth redistribution also reduced wealth inequality.

=== 1989–current ===
Though the 10th percentile of American households have zero net worth, the 90th percentile has $1.8 million of household wealth.

Median wealth of married couples is almost three times that of single individuals, regardless of gender and across all age categories.

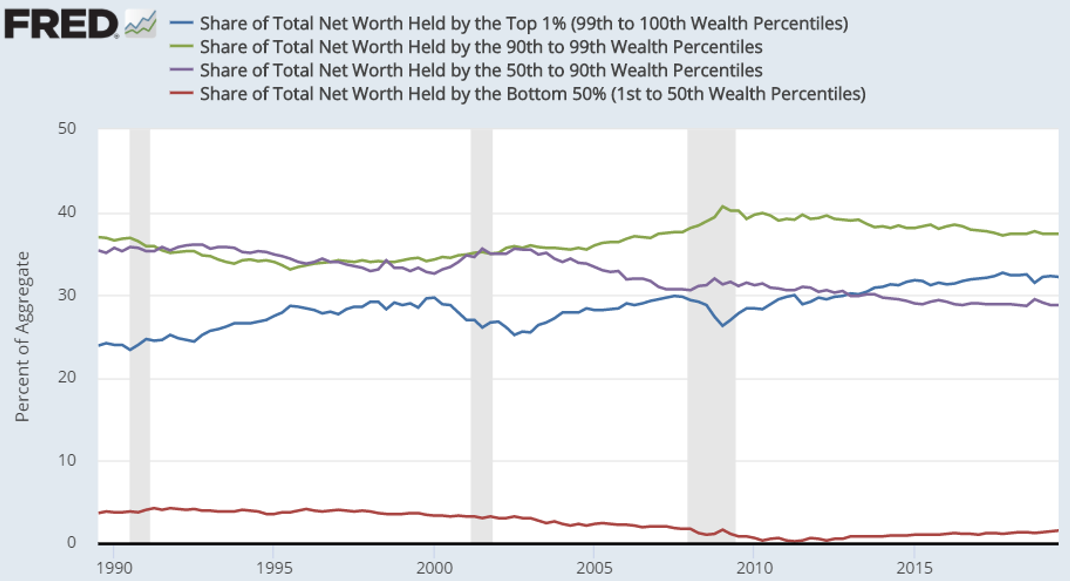
Trends in share of wealth held by various wealth groups 1989-2019

==== Role of Social Security ====
How wealth is measured affects inequality trends. Some measures count only marketable assets (e.g., stocks, housing, retirement accounts), while others also add the present value of already-accrued Social Security benefits. In the United States, employees pay 6.2% of wages in Social Security (OASDI) payroll tax, matched by employers for a total of 12.4%; of this, 5.3% + 5.3% funds Old-Age and Survivors Insurance (OASI) and 0.9% + 0.9% funds Disability Insurance (DI). These contributions create non-tradeable claims to future benefits. A 2025 study in the Journal of Finance finds that when accrued Social Security benefits are included in household wealth, the top 1% share rises only from about 22% (1989) to just under 24% (2019), and the top 10% increases by roughly 1–2 percentage points; by contrast, on marketable-wealth measures that exclude Social Security, top shares rose by about 6–10 percentage points over the same period. After 2019, marketable-wealth data from the Federal Reserve’s Distributional Financial Accounts indicate further concentration: the top 1% held about 31.0% of total household net worth in 2025:Q2 (versus ~30.5% in 2019:Q4). Comparable estimates that include accrued Social Security wealth for the 2020s have not yet been published. Note: Social Security benefits are non-tradeable and cannot be sold or borrowed against; including them flattens measured wealth trends but does not reflect control over purchasing power, liquid assets, or political power.

==== Effect of stock market gains ====
Stocks and real estate facilitated the accumulation of wealth for baby boomers. In 2024, the Silent Generation and baby boomers represented 25% of the population, but held 65% of all wealth in the US. Over time, wealth passes from generation to generation.

Older generations have accumulated more average wealth per person (vertical axis), but baby boomers as a group have the largest amount of wealth (areas within each rectangle). An estimated 73.9% of inheritors are already in the top ten percentiles of net worth.

Though baby boomers have accumulated more wealth than later generations, Millennials and Generation X are accumulating wealth at comparable rates to baby boomers.

Values of transaction accounts—those with immediate "on-demand" access—vary across age groups, with baby boomers being about 57-77 years old at the time of this study. Average account values are skewed upward by a small number of high-balance accounts. Median balances in transaction accounts better indicate readily available funds.

The Federal Reserve publishes quarterly data on the distribution of household assets, debt, and equity (net worth) dating back to 1989. The tables below summarize the net worth data in real terms (adjusted for inflation) for 1989 to 2022 and for 2016 to 2022. Journalist Matthew Yglesias explained in June 2019 how the ownership of stock has driven wealth inequality, as the bottom 50% has minimal stock ownership: "...[T]he bottom half of the income distribution had a huge share of its wealth tied up in real estate while owning essentially no shares of corporate stock. The top 1 percent, by contrast, wasn't just rich — it was specifically rich in terms of owning companies, both stock in publicly traded ones ("corporate equities") and shares of closely held ones ("private businesses")...So the value of those specific assets — assets that people in the bottom half of the distribution never had a chance to own in the first place — soared."

The National Public Radio, also known as NPR, reported in 2017 that the bottom 50% of U.S. households (by net worth) have little stock market exposure (neither directly nor indirectly through 401k plans), writing: "That means the stock market rally can only directly benefit around half of all Americans — and substantially fewer than it would have a decade ago when nearly two-thirds of families owned stock."

Some authors argue that these increases in wealth inequality indicate a Second Gilded Age in America.

Household Net Worth	Top 1%	90th to 99th	50th to 90th	Bottom 50%	Total
Q3 1989 ($ trillions)	11.51	18.26	17.72	1.86	49.35
Q1 2022 ($ trillions)	47.07	56.85	42.79	3.92	150.63
Increase ($ trillions)	35.56	38.59	25.07	2.06	101.28
% Increase	309%	211%	141%	111%	205%
Share of Increase (Increase/Total Increase)	35.1%	38.1%	24.8%	2.0%	100%
(Intentionally left blank)
Share of Net Worth Q3 1989	23.3%	37.0%	35.9%	3.8%	100%
Share of Net Worth Q1 2022	31.3%	37.7%	28.4%	2.6%	100%
Change in Share	+8.0%	+0.7%	-7.5%	-1.2%	0.0%

The table below shows changes from Q4 2016 (the end of the Obama Administration) to Q1 2022.

Household Net Worth	Top 1%	90th to 99th	50th to 90th	Bottom 50%	Total
Q4 2016 ($ trillions)	33.75	42.45	32.60	1.56	110.36
Q1 2022 ($ trillions)	47.07	56.85	42.79	3.92	150.63
Increase ($ trillions)	13.32	14.40	10.19	2.36	40.27
% Increase	39.5%	33.9%	31.3%	151.3%	36.5%
Share of Increase (Increase/Total Increase)	33.1%	35.7%	25.3%	5.9%	100%
(Intentionally left blank)
Share of Net Worth Q4 2016	30.6%	38.5%	29.5%	1.4%	100%
Share of Net Worth Q1 2022	31.3%	37.7%	28.4%	2.6%	100%
Change in Share	+0.7%	-0.8%	-1.1%	+1.2%	0.0%

== Wealth and income ==
Income and wealth, by educational level (US)

Median annual salaries across educational levels varied by a factor of about 3.

Median accumulated household wealth across educational levels varied by a factor of over 50.

Annual income and accumulated net worth, by age

2022. Annual income of U.S. families is near its highest throughout the 35-64 age group.

2022. Accumulated net worth of U.S. families peaks in the 65-74 year age group.

There is an important distinction between income and wealth. Income refers to a flow of money over time, commonly in the form of wages or salaries; wealth is the collection of assets owned, minus liabilities. In essence, income is what people receive through work, retirement, or social welfare, whereas wealth is what people own. While the two are related, income inequality alone is insufficient for understanding economic inequality for two reasons:

1. It does not accurately reflect an individual's economic position.
2. Income does not portray the severity of financial inequality in the United States.

In 1998, Dennis Gilbert asserted that the standard of living of the working and middle classes is dependent primarily upon income and wages, while the rich tend to rely on wealth, distinguishing them from the vast majority of Americans.

The United States Census Bureau formally defines income as money received regularly (exclusive of certain money receipts such as capital gains) before payments on personal income taxes, social security, union dues, Medicare deductions, etc. By this official measure, the wealthiest families may have low income, but the value of their assets may be enough money to support their lifestyle. Dividends from trusts or gains in the stock market do not fall under the aforementioned definition of income, but are commonly the primary source of capital for the ultra-wealthy. Retired people also have little income, but may have a high net worth, because of money saved over time.

Additionally, income does not capture the extent of wealth inequality. Wealth is most commonly obtained over time through the steady investing of income and the growth of assets. The income of one year does not typically encompass the accumulation over a lifetime. Income statistics cover too narrow a time span for it to be an adequate indicator of financial inequality. For example, the Gini coefficient for wealth inequality increased from 0.80 in 1983 to 0.84 in 1989. In the same year, 1989, the Gini coefficient for income was only 0.52. The Gini coefficient is an economic tool on a scale from 0 to 1 that measures the level of inequality. 1 signifies perfect inequality, and 0 represents perfect equality. From this data, it is evident that in 1989, there was a discrepancy in the levels of economic disparity: wealth inequality was significantly greater than income inequality. Recent research shows that many households, in particular, those headed by young parents (younger than 35), minorities, and individuals with low educational attainment, display very little accumulation. Many have no financial assets, and their total net worth is also low.

According to the Congressional Budget Office, between 1979 and 2007, incomes of the top 1% of Americans grew by an average of 275%. (Note: The IRS insists that comparisons of adjusted gross income pre-1987 and post-1987 are complicated by large changes in the definition of AGI, which led to households within the top income quintile reporting more of their income on their individual income tax form's AGI, rather than reporting their business income in separate corporate tax returns, or not reporting certain non-taxable income in their AGI at all, such as municipal bond income. In addition, IRS studies consistently show that a majority of households in the top income quintile have moved to a lower quintile within one decade. There are even more changes to households in the top 1%. Without including the data here, a reader is likely to assume households in the top 1% are almost the same from year to year.) In 2009, people in the top 1% of taxpayers made $343,927 or more. According to US economist Joseph Stiglitz, the richest 1% of Americans gained 93% of the additional income created in 2010.

A study by Emmanuel Saez and Piketty showed that the top 10 percent of earners earned more than half of the country's total income in 2012, the highest level recorded since the government began collecting the relevant data a century ago. People in the top one percent were three times more likely to work more than 50 hours a week, were more likely to be self-employed, and earned a fifth of their income as capital income. The top one percent was composed of many professions and had an annual turnover rate of more than 25%. The five most common professions were managers, physicians, administrators, lawyers, and teachers.

A 2022 study in PNAS found that earnings inequality in the United States did not increase over the preceding decade, marking the first reversal of rising earnings inequality since 1980. The reversal was due to a narrowing wage gap between low-wage workers and median-wage earners, driven by broad-based wage increases in low-wage professions. At the same time, the gap between median-wage workers and top earners widened.

== U.S. stock market ownership distribution ==
In 2025, the wealthiest 1% of Americans owned nearly 50% of the stock market. The top 10% own 87.2%, and the bottom half owned 1.1%.

Corporate equities and real estate facilitated the accumulation of wealth for baby boomers. In 2024, the Silent Generation and baby boomers represented 25% of the population, but held 65% of all wealth in the US. Over time, wealth passes from generation to generation.

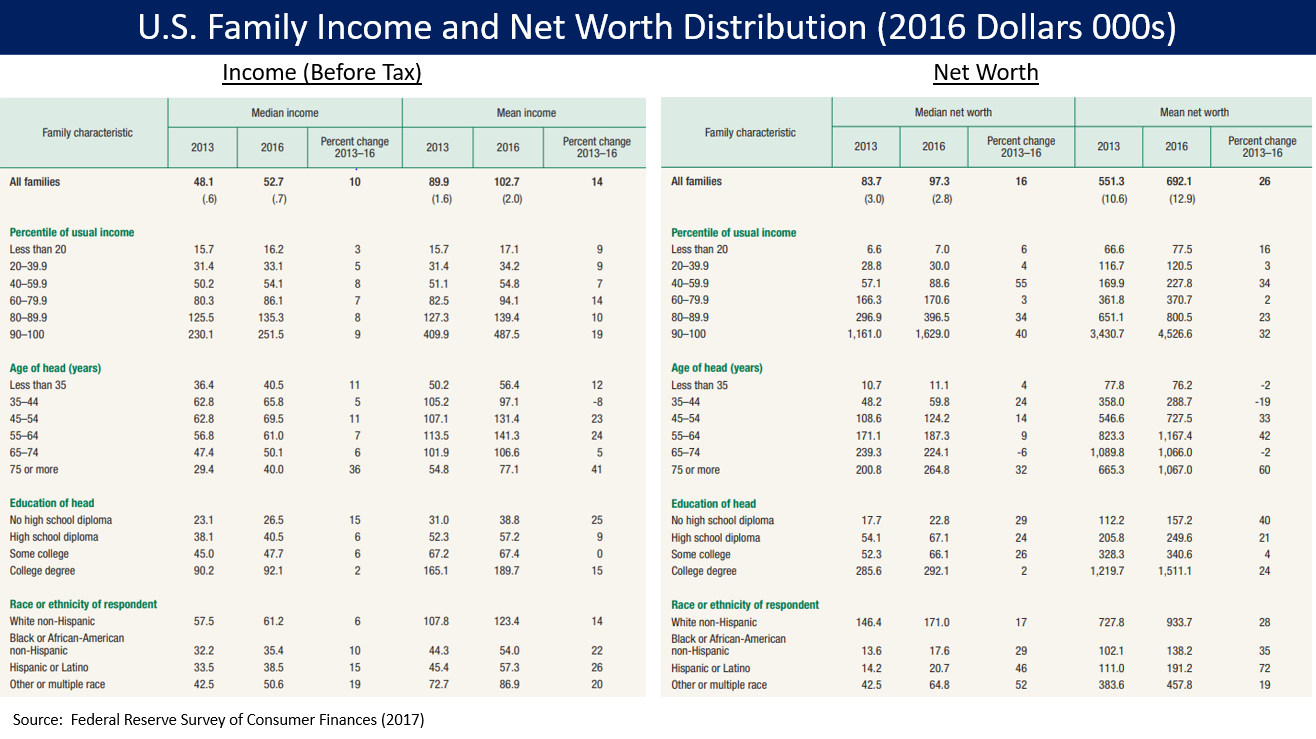
U.S. family pre-tax income and net worth distribution for 2013 and 2016, from the Federal Reserve Survey of Consumer Finances

In March 2017, NPR summarized the distribution of U.S. stock market ownership (direct and indirect through mutual funds) in the U.S., which is highly concentrated among the wealthiest families:

- 52% of U.S. adults owned stock in 2016. Ownership peaked at 65% in 2007 and fell significantly due to the Great Recession.
- As of 2013, the top 1% of households owned 38% of the stock market wealth.
- As of 2013, the top 10% own 81% of the stock wealth, the next 10% (80th to 90th percentile) own 11%, and the bottom 80% own 8%.

The Federal Reserve reported the median value of stock ownership by income group for 2016:

- Bottom 20% own $5,800.
- 20th-40th percentile own $10,000.
- 40th to 60th percentile own $15,500.
- 60th to 80th percentile own $31,700.
- 80th to 89th percentile own $82,000.
- Top 10% own $365,000.

NPR reported that when politicians cite the stock market as a measure of economic success, that measure is irrelevant to nearly half of Americans. Further, more than one-third of Americans who work full-time have no access to pensions or retirement accounts such as 401(k)s that derive their value from financial assets like stocks and bonds. The NYT reported that the percentage of workers covered by generous defined-benefit pension plans has declined from 62% in 1983 to 17% by 2016. While some economists consider an increase in the stock market to have a "wealth effect" that increases economic growth, economists like Former Dallas Federal Reserve Bank President Richard Fisher believe those effects are limited.

== Causes of wealth inequality ==
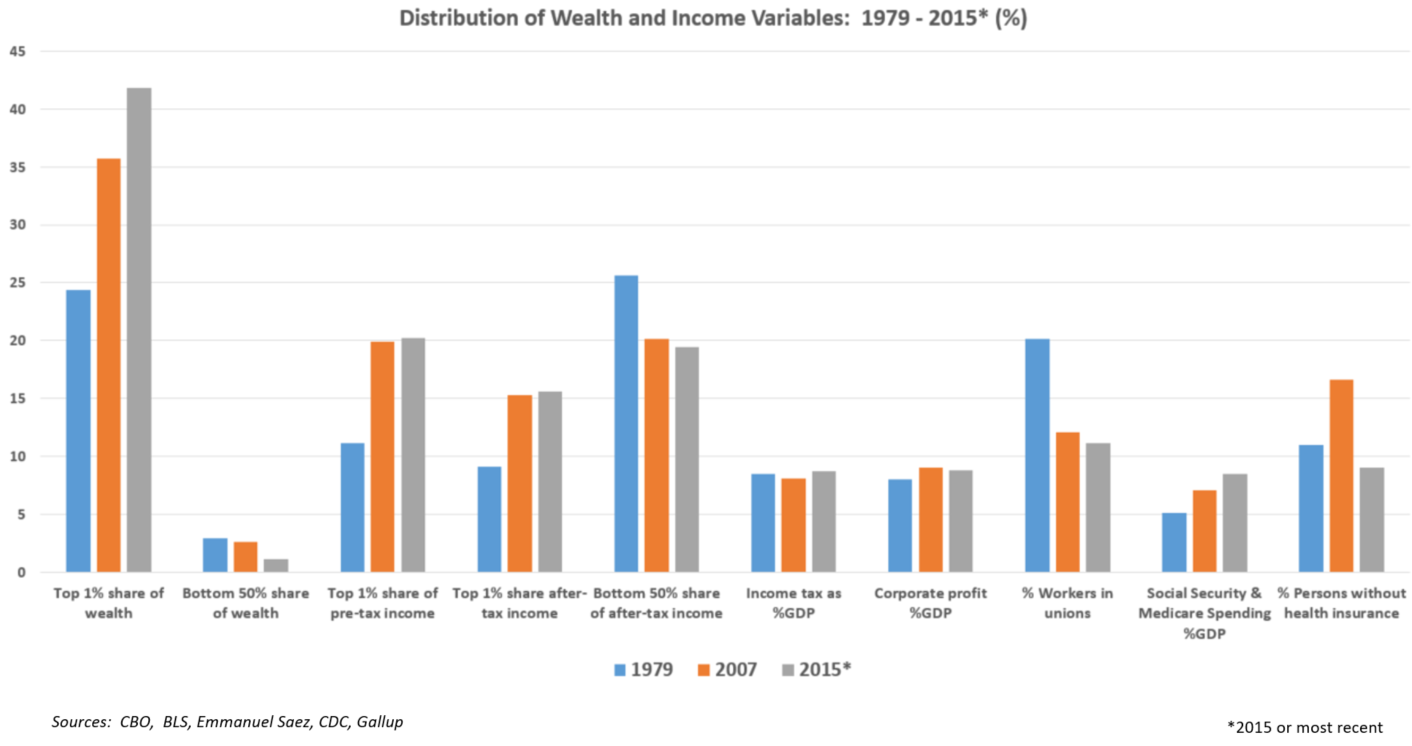
Selected economic variables related to wealth and income equality, comparing 1979, 2007, and 2015

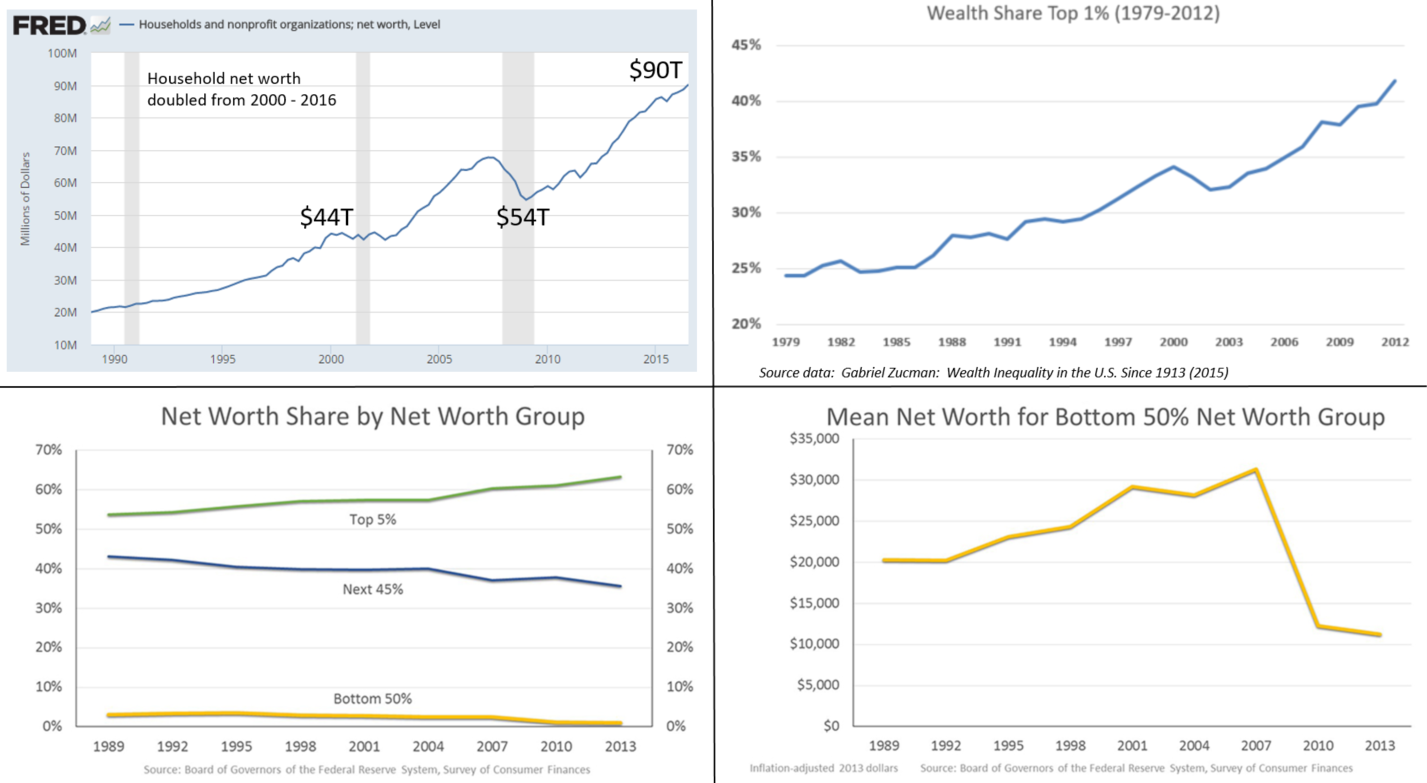
The image contains several charts related to U.S. wealth inequality. While U.S. net worth roughly doubled from 2000 to 2016, the gains went primarily to the wealthy.

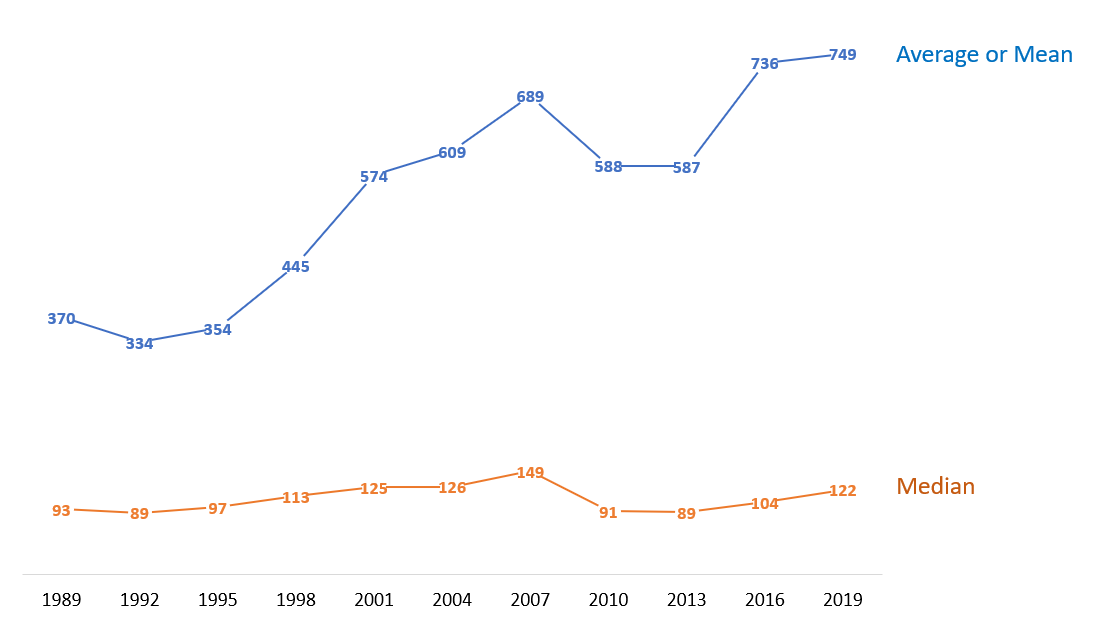
U.S. median family net worth peaked in 2007, declined due to the Great Recession until 2013, and only partially recovered by 2016.

Essentially, the wealthy possess greater financial opportunities that allow their money to make more money. Earnings from the stock market or mutual funds are reinvested to generate higher returns. Over time, the sum invested grows. Those who are not wealthy, however, lack the resources to enhance their opportunities and improve their economic position. Rather, "after debt payments, poor families are constrained to spend the remaining income on items that will not produce wealth and will depreciate over time." Scholar David B. Grusky notes that "62 percent of households headed by single parents are without savings or other financial assets." Net indebtedness generally prevents people experiencing poverty from having any opportunity to accumulate wealth and thereby better their conditions.

=== Economic inequality ===
Economic inequality is also a result of income differences. Factors that contribute to this gap in wages are things such as level of education, labor market demand and supply, gender differences, growth in technology, and personal abilities. The quality and level of education a person has often correspond to their skill level, which is reflected in their income. Wages are also determined by the "market price of a skill" at that current time. Although gender inequality is a distinct social issue, it contributes to economic inequality. According to the U.S. Census Report, the median full-time salary for women in America is 77 percent of that for men. Also contributing to the wealth inequality in the U.S., both unskilled and skilled workers are being replaced by machinery. The Seven Pillars Institute for Global Finance and Ethics argues that because of this "technological advance", the income gap between workers and owners has widened.

Income inequality contributes to wealth inequality. For example, economist Emmanuel Saez wrote in June 2016 that the top 1% of families captured 52% of the total real income (GDP) growth per family from 2009 to 2015. From 2009 to 2012, the top 1% captured 91% of the income gains.

Nepotism perpetuates and increases wealth inequality. Wealthy families pass down their assets, allowing future generations to develop even more wealth. People experiencing poverty, on the other hand, are less able to leave inheritances to their children, leaving the latter with little or no wealth on which to build. Wealthy parents often use their economic or political power to advantage their own children, such as by providing extra funding for education, excluding low-income families from the local community or schools (usually through exclusionary zoning), using social connections to provide opportunities for advancement like internships, and allowing children to take entrepreneurial risks without risking homelessness or destitution.

In terms of financial resources, the wealthy strategically organize their money to generate profit. Affluent people are more likely to allocate their money to financial assets such as stocks, bonds, and other investments that offer the potential for capital appreciation. Those who are not wealthy are more likely to have their money in savings accounts and to own homes. This difference comprises the largest reason for the continuation of wealth inequality in America: the rich are accumulating more assets while the middle and working classes are just getting by. As of 2007, the richest 1% held about 38% of all privately held wealth in the United States. While the bottom 90% held 73.2% of all debt. According to The New York Times, the richest 1 percent in the United States now own more wealth than the bottom 90 percent.

However, other studies argue that a higher average savings rate will reduce the share of wealth owned by the rich. The reason is that the rich in terms of wealth are not necessarily the individuals with the highest incomes. Therefore, the relative share of wealth held by the poorer quintiles of the population would increase if the savings rate were very high, although the absolute difference from the wealthiest quintile would also increase.

The nature of tax policies in America has been argued by economists and politicians such as Emmanuel Saez, Thomas Piketty, and Barack Obama to perpetuate economic inequality by funneling large sums of wealth into the hands of the wealthiest Americans. The mechanism is that when the wealthy avoid paying taxes, wealth concentrates in their coffers while the poor go into debt.

The economist Joseph Stiglitz argues that "Strong unions have helped to reduce inequality, whereas weaker unions have made it easier for CEOs, sometimes working with market forces that they have helped shape, to increase it." The long decline in unionization in the U.S. has corresponded with the rise in wealth and income inequality since WWII.

Some tax policies subsidize wealthy people more than poor people; critics often argue the home mortgage interest deduction should be abolished because it provides more tax relief for people in higher tax brackets and with more expensive homes, and that poorer people are more often renters and therefore less likely to be able to use this deduction at all. Regressive taxes include payroll taxes, sales taxes, and fuel taxes.

A 2022 study in the American Economic Journal found that greater economic inequality in the United States than in Europe was not due to the nature of the United States' tax and transfer systems. The study found that the U.S. redistributes a greater share of its wealth to the bottom half of the income distribution than any European country. The study found, instead, that Europe had lower economic inequality because it was more successful at ensuring that the bottom half of the income distribution could obtain relatively well-paying jobs.

=== Tax avoidance on inheritance ===
A 2021 investigation using leaked IRS documents found more than half of the richest 100 Americans use grantor retained annuity trusts to avoid paying estate taxes when they die.

=== Lifetime tax avoidance ===
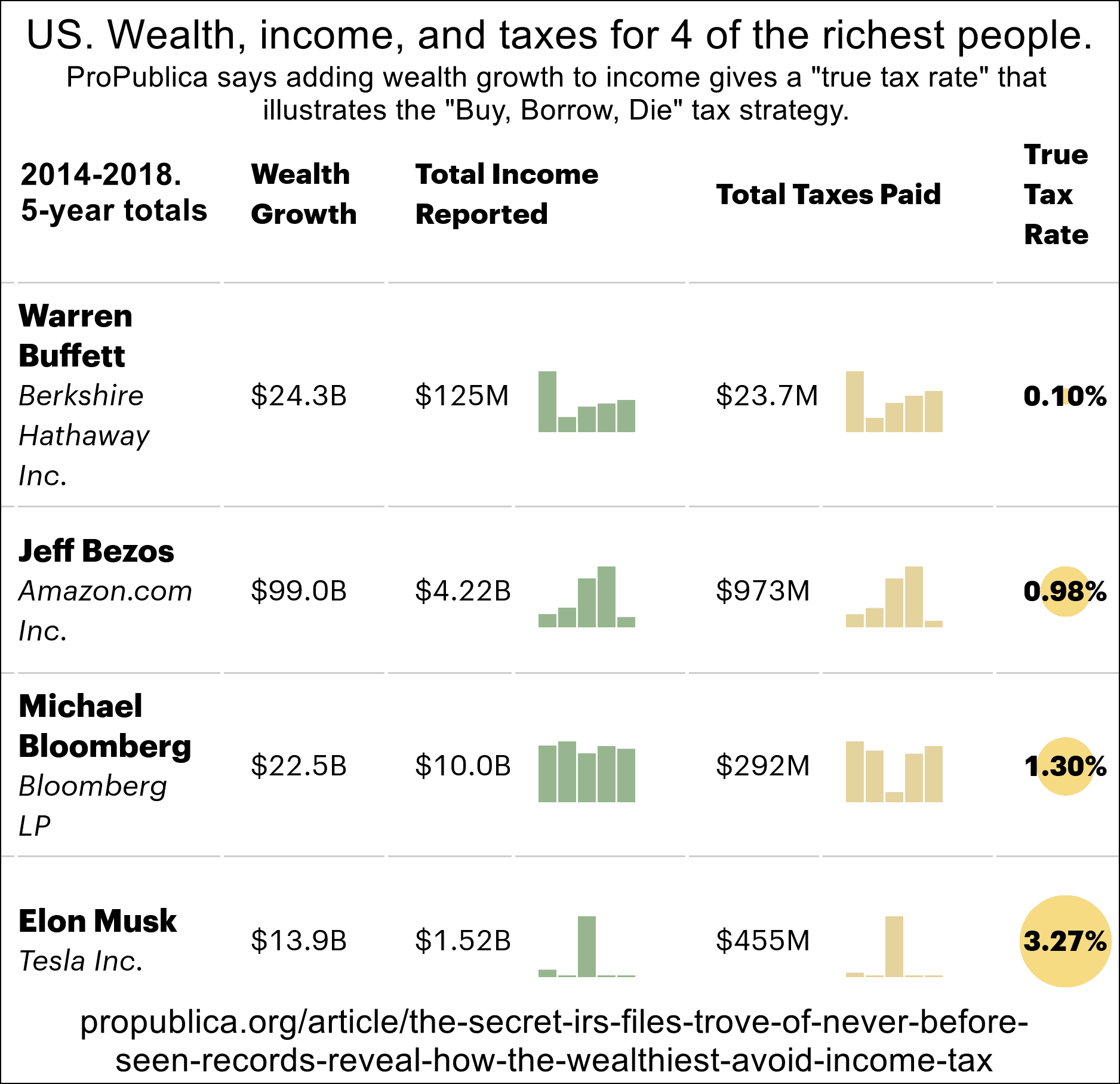
ProPublica says adding wealth growth to income gives a "true tax rate" that illustrates the "Buy, Borrow, Die" tax strategy.

Another tax avoidance method avoids taxes both during one's lifetime and at death:

- Avoid paying tax on capital gains with the "buy, borrow, die" technique:
  - Buy or earn capital assets like stocks and real estate, and then never sell because assets do not count as income until sold.
  - Using capital assets as collateral to borrow spending money at interest rates considerably lower than the tax rate; loans are not taxed as income.
  - Holding capital assets until after death, when a "step-up in basis" zeroes out the accumulated gains and allows heirs to not pay any capital gains tax.
  - Loans signed by the deceased are paid off by the estate. When an investor dies with a stock-collateralized loan (like a securities-backed line of credit), the pledged stock receives a tax-free step-up in basis to its fair market value, the loan remains an obligation of the estate, and heirs can sell the stepped-up shares tax-free to clear the debt.

== Racial disparities ==
Net Worth (Wealth) of US Families. By race or ethnicity, 2025.
Race or Ethnicity	Median Net Worth	Average Net Worth
Asian	$677,600	$2,218,100
Black	$36,800	$242,400
Latine	$79,600	$334,100
White	$332,100	$1,694,700
Other or Multiple Races	$97,500	$519,400

The wealth gap between white and black families nearly tripled from $85,000 in 1984 to $236,500 in 2009.

A Brandeis University Institute on Assets and Social Policy paper cites years of homeownership, household income, unemployment, education, and inheritance as leading causes of the widening gap, concluding that homeownership is the most important. Inheritance can directly link the disadvantaged economic position and prospects of today's blacks to the disadvantaged positions of their parents' and grandparents' generations, according to a report done by Robert B. Avery and Michael S. Rendall that pointed out "one in three white households will receive a substantial inheritance during their lifetime compared to only one in ten black households." In the journal Sociological Perspectives, Lisa Keister reports that family size and structure during childhood "are related to racial differences in adult wealth accumulation trajectories, allowing whites to begin accumulating high-yield assets earlier in life."

The article "America's Financial Divide" added context to racial wealth inequality, stating:

... nearly 96.1 percent of the 1.2 million households in the top one percent by income were white, a total of about 1,150,000 households. In addition, these families were found to have a median net asset worth of $8.3 million. In stark contrast, in the same piece, black households were shown as a mere 1.4 percent of the top one percent by income, that's only 16,800 homes. In addition, their median net asset worth was just $1.2 million. Using this data as an indicator only several thousand of the over 14 million African American households have more than $1.2 million in net assets ...

Relying on data from Credit Suisse and Brandeis University's Institute on Assets and Social Policy, the Harvard Business Review in the article "How America's Wealthiest Black Families Invest Money" stated:

If you're white and have a net worth of about $356,000, that's good enough to put you in the 72nd percentile of white families. If you're black, it's good enough to catapult you into the 95th percentile." This means 28 percent of the total 83 million white homes, or over 23 million white households, have more than $356,000 in net assets. While only 700,000 of the 14 million black homes have more than $356,000 in total net worth.

According to Inequality.org, the median black family is worth only $1,700 after durables are deducted. In contrast, the median white family holds $116,800 of wealth using the same accounting methods. Today, using Wolff's analysis, the median African American family holds a mere 1.5 percent of the median white American family's wealth.

A recent piece on Eurweb/Electronic Urban Report, "Black Wealth Hardly Exists, Even When You Include NBA, NFL and Rap Stars", stated this about the difference between black middle-class families and white middle-class families:

Going even further into the data, a recent study by the Institute for Policy Studies (IPS) and the Corporation For Economic Development (CFED) found that it would take 228 years for the average black family to amass the same level of wealth the average white family holds today in 2016. All while white families create even more wealth over those same two hundred years. In fact, this is a gap that will never close if America stays on its current economic path. According to the Institute on Assets and Social Policy, for each dollar of increase in average income an African American household saw from 1984 to 2009 just $0.69 in additional wealth was generated, compared with the same dollar in increased income creating an additional $5.19 in wealth for a similarly situated white household.

Author Lilian Singh wrote on why the perceptions about black life created by media are misleading in the American Prospect article "Black Wealth On TV: Realities Don't Match Perceptions":

Black programming features TV shows that collectively create false perceptions of wealth for African-American families. The images displayed are in stark contrast to the economic conditions the average black family is battling each day.

According to an article by the Pew Research Center, the median wealth of non-Hispanic black households fell nearly 38% from 2010 to 2013. During that time, the median wealth of those households fell from $16,600 to $13,700. The median wealth of Hispanic families fell by 14.3%, from $16,000 to $14,000. Despite the median net worth of all households in the United States decreasing with time, as of 2013, white households had a median net worth of $141,900 while black house households had a median net worth of just $11,000. Hispanic households had a median net worth of just $13,700 over that time as well.

In 2023, the Federal Reserve Board published median and mean family wealth statistics for 2022, based on a nationwide survey of 4,602 families. The average white family's median net worth was $285,000. Hispanic families had a median net worth of $61,600, and black families had a median net worth of $44,900. Although black families had the lowest median net worth of all racial groups, they experienced the greatest percent increase in net worth from 2019 to 2022, at 60 percent. For the first time, the survey calculated net worth for Asian families separately (they had previously been grouped into an "other" category with Native American, Pacific Islander, and multiracial families). Asian families had the highest median net worth, at $536,000.

== Effect on democracy ==
A 2014 study by researchers at Princeton and Northwestern concludes that government policies reflect the desires of the wealthy, and that the vast majority of American citizens have "minuscule, near-zero, statistically non-significant impact upon public policy. When a majority of citizens disagrees with economic elites and/or with organized interests, they generally lose."

When Janet Yellen, the chair of the Federal Reserve was questioned by Senator Bernie Sanders about the study at a congressional hearing in May 2014, she responded "There's no question that we've had a trend toward growing inequality" and that this trend "can shape [and] determine the ability of different groups to participate equally in a democracy and have grave effects on social stability over time."

In Capital in the Twenty-First Century, French economist Thomas Piketty argues that "extremely high levels" of wealth inequality are "incompatible with the meritocratic values and principles of social justice fundamental to modern democratic societies" and that "the risk of a drift towards oligarchy is real and gives little reason for optimism about where the United States is headed."

== Proposals to reduce wealth inequality ==
Total effective tax rates (includes all taxes: federal+state income tax, sales tax, property tax, etc) for the richest Americans declined by 2018 to a level beneath that of the bottom 50% of earners, contributing to wealth inequality. Analysis by economists Emmanuel Saez and Gabriel Zucman.

=== Estate tax ===
There is a political debate over the estate tax in the United States, which reduces inequality by taxing the estates of the wealthy. The Tax Cuts and Jobs Act of 2017 doubled the estate exemption by increasing the exemption from $5.49 million in 2017 to $11.18 million in 2018. This increase in estate exemption was estimated to affect about 3,200 estates in 2018.

On top of the federal estate tax, 17 states have an estate or inheritance tax.

=== Increased tax ===
In President Joe Biden's proposed 2023 budget, there were two tax changes for households with wealth above $100 million. First, there was a new "minimum tax" at death for unrealized capital gains above $1 million. Second was to treat realized capital gains as ordinary income, which is expected to effectively raise the percentage of capital taxed from 23.8% to 43.4%. Combined, these tax changes were estimated to place these households at an effective tax rate of 61.1%, nearly double the rate in 2022.

=== Taxation of wealth ===
Senator Bernie Sanders proposed a wealth tax in the US in 2014. Later, Senator Elizabeth Warren proposed an annual tax on wealth in January 2019, specifically a 2% tax for wealth over $50 million and another 1% surcharge on wealth over $1 billion. Wealth is defined as including all asset classes, including financial assets and real estate. In 2021, officials in the state of Washington considered proposals to tax wealthy residents.

Warren's plan received both praise and criticism. Economist Paul Krugman wrote in January 2019 that polls indicate the idea of taxing the rich more is very popular. Two billionaires, Michael Bloomberg and Howard Schultz, criticized the proposal as "unconstitutional" and "ridiculous," respectively. Economists Emmanuel Saez and Gabriel Zucman analyzed Warren's proposal and estimated that about 75,000 households (less than 0.1%) would pay the tax. The tax was expected to raise around $2.75 trillion over 10 years, roughly 1% GDP on average per year. This was expected to raise the total tax burden for those subject to the wealth tax from 3.2% of their wealth under current law to about 4.3% on average, compared with 7.2% for the bottom 99% of families. For scale, the federal budget deficit in 2018 was 3.9% GDP and was expected to rise towards 5% GDP over the next decade. An analysis by the think tank Tax Foundation found that Warren's proposal would reduce long-term GDP by 0.37% and raise $2.2 trillion over a period of ten years, after factoring in macroeconomic feedback effects. It expected the tax to "face serious administrative and compliance challenges due to valuation difficulties and tax evasion and avoidance issues." It also expected foreign investors to replace American billionaires as the owners of capital.

At the state level, SEIU United Healthcare Workers West filed a California ballot initiative in 2025 proposing a one-time 5% tax on residents with net worth exceeding $1 billion, with revenues directed primarily to healthcare. The proposal received support from figures including U.S. Senator Bernie Sanders and U.S. Representative Ro Khanna, while Governor Gavin Newsom opposed it and some billionaires, including Google co-founders Sergey Brin and Larry Page, reportedly left the state. The initiative also prompted a small March for Billionaires protest in San Francisco.

=== Limiting stock buybacks ===
In January 2019, Senators Charles Schumer and Bernie Sanders advocated limiting stock buybacks to reduce income and wealth inequality.

== See also ==
- Affluence in the United States
- American oligarchs
- Citizens United v. Federal Election Commission
- Criticism of credit scoring systems in the United States
- Donor Class
- Glass ceiling
- Monetary policy
- Net worth
- Occupy movement
- Occupy Wall Street
- Panama Papers
- Paradise Papers
- Pareto principle
- Power elite
- Redistribution of wealth
- Tax policy and economic inequality in the United States
- The Divide: American Injustice in the Age of the Wealth Gap
- Wealth concentration
- Wealth in the United States
- We are the 99%
- American upper class
- List of Americans by net worth
