= Chris Howard =

Chris or Christopher Howard may refer to:

- Christopher Howard (professor) (born 1961), an American political scientist
- Chris Howard (pitcher) (Christian Hugh Howard; born 1965), American baseball pitcher
- Chris Howard (catcher) (Christopher Hugh Howard; born 1966), American baseball catcher
- Christopher B. Howard (born c. 1969), American college administrator
- Chris Howard (American football) (born 1975), American football player
- Christopher R. Howard, American novelist

== See also ==
- Christian Howard (disambiguation)
