= Enterprise Value Tax =

U.S. Congress tax proposal

Enterprise Value Tax was a tax proposal considered by the United States Congress. It passed in the US House of Representatives in 2010 as part of "H.R. 4213: American Jobs and Closing Tax Loopholes Act". The bill was not passed by the Senate, and hence did not become law. Nonetheless the concept of the tax has recurred in succeeding years, most recently as a speculation over Donald Trump's promise to do "something huge".

The tax was opposed as detrimental to entrepreneurs re-investing funds from the sale of businesses. It was described by Richard A. Baker, CEO of the Hudson's Bay Company, as "a stealth attack on capital gains". Conversely the "carried interest tax loophole" was cited as reason to increase taxes on those doing well from the taxation of certain businesses, notably hedge fund managers.

Enterprise value, in this context, has been described as another expression for goodwill.

== See also ==
- Capital gains tax
- Sweat equity
- Carried interest
- Tax policy and economic inequality in the United States
