= Home mortgage interest deduction =

Tax deduction on mortgage interest

A home mortgage interest deduction is a form of housing subsidy that allows taxpayers who own their homes to reduce their taxable income by the amount of interest paid on the loan which is secured by their principal residence (or, sometimes, a second home). The mortgage deduction makes home purchases more attractive, but contributes to higher house prices.

Most economists believe mortgage interest deduction is bad policy and is counterproductive. They note that it increases inequality, is an unnecessary market distortion, and contributes to housing unaffordability.

Most developed countries do not allow a deduction for interest on personal loans, but the Netherlands, Switzerland, the United States, Belgium, Denmark, and Ireland allow some form of the deduction.

== Effectiveness ==
The Mortgage Interest Deduction (MID) is a widely used policy intended to promote homeownership. However, several studies suggest that its effect on homeownership rates is limited or even negative.

Glaeser and Shapiro (2003) point out that the deduction mainly benefits higher-income households, who are typically homeowners regardless of the subsidy. Empirical research by Hanson (2012) confirms that the MID does not increase homeownership but instead leads to the purchase of larger and more expensive homes.

In housing markets with inelastic supply, the value of the MID is often capitalized into higher house prices, increasing the financial barriers to entry. According to Hilber and Turner (2014), the MID can even reduce homeownership in such markets by raising down payment requirements and future mortgage costs. Only in areas with lax land-use regulations does the MID appear to modestly promote homeownership among middle- and higher-income households.

Simulations by Sommer and Sullivan (2018) suggest that eliminating the MID would lower house prices, reduce household mortgage debt, slightly increase homeownership, and improve overall welfare. Blouri et al. (2021) also find that repealing the MID has a small negative impact on ownership rates but a positive effect on welfare overall.

Similar findings have been reported in Europe. A quasi-natural experiment in Denmark (Gruber et al., 2022) found no effect of the MID on homeownership among middle- and higher-income households, but did observe increases in home size and household debt.

== Status in countries ==
=== Canada ===
Canadian federal income tax does not allow a deduction from taxable income for interest on loans secured by the taxpayer's personal residence, but landlords who own rental residential or commercial property may deduct mortgage interest as a reasonable business expense; the difference between the two being that the deduction is only allowed when the property is not for the taxpayer's personal use, but is rented as a business. However, there may be additional exclusions for passive activity losses.

An indirect method, known as The Smith Manoeuvre, for making interest on mortgage for personal residence tax deductible in Canada is through an asset swap, whereby the homebuyer sells his existing investments, purchases a house in full or in part by the sale, gets a mortgage on the house, and finally, buys back his investments with the money from the mortgage.

The Supreme Court of Canada has ruled in 2001 in the Singleton v. Canada case that transactions in the asset swap are to be regarded as distinct, thus rendering the interest on home mortgage acquired as part of the asset swap tax deductible.

The home ownership rate in Canada was about the same as in the United States in 2008 despite the difference in tax policy. Notably, though, the proportion of residential properties used to secure a mortgage in Canada is much lower than in the USA; Canadians, lacking mortgage interest deductability, tend to pay off their residential mortgages faster than their US counterparts.

In counterpoint, capital gains realised from the sale of a taxpayer's personal residence are not taxable under Canadian law. This does not apply to secondary residences.

=== Denmark ===
In Denmark part of the interest is deductible. In 1987 it was 73%. In 1993 it was 50% and in 1998 it was 46%. From 1998 to 2001 it was reduced to 32%. It was proposed in 2019 to lower it to 25.5% but it was not adopted. There have been minor changes up and down and the rate is today 33.5%.

=== France ===
France does not allow a home mortgage interest deduction. In 2007, newly elected President Nicolas Sarkozy proposed creating the deduction as part of his legislative plan for sparking the French economy. In August 2007, the Constitutional Council, the highest court in France, struck down the mortgage interest deduction as unconstitutionally creating a tax advantage that goes far beyond its stated goal of encouraging non-homeowners to buy homes. The Court noted that the deduction would apply to people who already own homes.

=== India ===
Home loan interest portion is deductible (under section 24(b)) up to 150,000 rupees in a tax year for acquiring or constructing a property. The deduction is available only when the construction is complete or the owner takes possession of the property. Interest of pre-construction period is deductible in five equal installments. The first installment is deductible in the year in which construction of property is completed or property acquired. The principal is deductible under section 80C, which has a limit of 150,000 rupees.

=== Netherlands ===
In the Netherlands, a part of the interest payments can be deducted for a maximum period of 30 years. The deduction percentage is based on a person's income. However, before deduction the taxable income is increased by a percentage of the property value (so-called "notional rental value") with the reasoning that the property has a potential income-generating purpose.

Still in place currently, the mortgage interest tax deduction is subject to fierce debate, and a political issue during most recent elections. Although largely an emotional point of discussion with the Dutch electorate, and described by many as "political suicide", most Dutch people believe that the mortgage interest tax deduction will eventually be reformed. Many reasons for abolishment have been identified, often fuelled by a political ideology (e.g. creating house price inflation, limiting government earnings in times of economic downturn, mortgage interest tax deduction is increasing already high tax levels in the Netherlands, benefiting high income individuals more disproportionally).

As it stands now, Dutch politicians and other organisations research possible strategies to end interest payments tax deduction and are fuelling public debate to prepare the Dutch public for eventual abolishment. Only 18% of the Dutch public support eliminating the mortgage interest deduction entirely.

=== Norway ===
Norway considers any interest paid, whether it is for a home mortgage or other debt, as a deductible expense. The result is a reduction of the tax bill of 22% of all interest paid. The fact that the government in effect subsidises 25% of the interest bill has made home ownership highly beneficial in Norway, and critics argue that the deduction has increased the cost of real estate. The Center Party has proposed reducing the deduction.

=== Sweden ===
For secured loans, a tax credit of 30% of interest up until 100,000 SEK, and 21% over that amount.

=== United Kingdom ===
When income tax was first introduced in the United Kingdom in the early 19th century, interest on loans could be set against tax. However, in 1969 the then Chancellor of the Exchequer, Roy Jenkins, ended this tax relief for all loans except for business purposes or for home buyers. This meant that borrowers could no longer claim tax relief on, for example, the interest on bank loans or overdrafts, but relief on home loans was still available.

In 1983, the Government introduced a scheme for home loans called MIRAS, which, by limiting the available relief to the basic rate of tax, aimed to reduce the benefit of the tax relief.

Reductions during the 1990s in the amount of tax relief that was included with MIRAS loan repayments gradually cut its value until it was abolished in 2000 by the then Chancellor Gordon Brown.

=== United States ===
Prior to the Tax Reform Act of 1986 (TRA86), the interest on all personal loans (including credit card debt) was deductible. TRA86 eliminated that broad deduction, but left the narrower home mortgage interest deduction. While some Americans may believe that Congress created the home mortgage interest deduction as a way to encourage home ownership, historians point out that this was never the case, as explained in a New York Times article that notes that, in 1913, when interest deductions started, Congress "certainly wasn't thinking of the interest deduction as a stepping-stone to middle-class home ownership, because the tax excluded the first $3,000 (or for married couples, $4,000) of income; less than 1 percent of the population earned more than that;" moreover, during that era, most people who purchased homes paid upfront rather than taking out a mortgage. Rather, the reason for the deduction was that in a nation of small proprietors, it was more difficult to separate business and personal expenses, and so it was simpler to just allow deduction of all interest.

Under 26 U.S.C. § 163(h) of the Internal Revenue Code, the United States allows a home mortgage interest deduction, with several limitations. First, the taxpayer must elect to itemize deductions, and the total itemized deductions must exceed the standard deduction (otherwise, itemization would not reduce tax). Second, the deduction is limited to interest on debts secured by a principal residence or a second home. Third, interest is deductible on only the first $1 million of debt used for acquiring, constructing, or substantially improving the residence, ($500,000 if filing separately) or the first $100,000 of home equity debt regardless of the purpose or use of the loan.

In the United States, there are additional tax incentives for home ownership. For example, taxpayers are allowed an exclusion of up to $250,000 ($500,000 for a married couple filing jointly) of capital gains on the sale of real property if the owner used it as primary residence for two of the five years before the date of sale. Economists have demonstrated that high-cost high-income areas receive most of the tax benefit. For example, in 1999, San Francisco, California received $26,385 per home while El Paso, Texas received $2,153 per home, a 1,225% difference. In 2005, the five highest income metros received 87% of tax inflows, with over half going into California alone.

==== Policy debate ====
The deduction is the focus of policy debate in the United States. The standard justification for the deduction is that it incentivizes home ownership. but most economists believe the deduction is bad policy and is counterproductive. They note that it increases inequality, is an unnecessary market distortion, and contributes to housing unaffordability.

The National Association of Realtors strongly supports mortgage interest deduction; in 2008, the association contended that "Home prices, particularly in high cost areas, could decline 15 percent if recommendations to convert the mortgage interest deduction to a tax credit are implemented."

The Tax Foundation, by contrast, argues that few low- and middle-income taxpayers benefit from the deduction, calling it a subsidy for the real estate industry. Alan Mallach, a senior fellow at the Center for Community Progress and a visiting scholar at the Federal Reserve Bank of Philadelphia, argues that the deduction artificially inflates home prices. According to a 2013 analysis, conversion of the tax deduction to a tax credit, and reduction of the amount of principle covered by the credit, would raise about $200 billion over ten years.

Economist Edward Glaeser remarked in a New York Times blog post that the policy "is public paternalism at its worst" and wrongfully "encourages people to leave urban areas" as well as to borrow as much as possible to bet on housing.

In a 2012 panel on PBS Need to Know, Eliot Spitzer, the former Democratic governor of New York; tax law professor Dorothy A. Brown; Reagan domestic policy advisor Bruce Bartlett; and libertarian economist Daniel J. Mitchell unanimously opposed the federal mortgage interest deduction.

A 2018 American Economic Review study found that eliminating the mortgage interest deduction would causes reductions in house prices, increases in homeownership, decreases in mortgage debt, and welfare improvements.

==== Effect of the Tax Cuts and Jobs Act of 2017 ====
Because the Tax Cuts and Jobs Act of 2017 increased the standard deduction to a level where far fewer taxpayers itemized their expenses (which is where they deduct mortgage interest), the cost to the federal government of the mortgage interest deduction was decreased by 60%, from approximately $60 billion in 2017 to $25 billion in 2018.

== See also ==
- Hidden welfare state
- Interest
- Land value tax
- Loan
- Mortgage loan
- Qualified residence interest
- Tax deduction
- Tax policy
- Taxable income
