= Hidden welfare state =

Tax expenditures with social welfare objectives

The hidden welfare state is a term coined by Christopher Howard, professor of government at the College of William and Mary, to refer to tax expenditures with social welfare objectives that are often not included in discussions about the U.S. welfare state. Howard's terminology implies that "visible" social welfare programs are designed to help the neediest, but the "hidden" programs often offer benefits to wealthier individuals and companies.

- Programs that constitute the visible welfare state of direct expenditures include: Social Security, Medicare, and Aid to Families with Dependent Children (AFDC, now Temporary Assistance to Needy Families).
- The hidden welfare state refers to tax expenditures (deductions) with social welfare objectives: tax deductions for retirement saving, charitable contributions, higher education, and the home mortgage interest deduction. All of these deductions benefit constituencies with considerable disposable income.

Tax expenditures and direct expenditures essentially have the same effect on the federal budget. Direct expenditures represent the amount of money the government is paying out, whereas, tax expenditures represent the amount of money not collected by the government.

To better understand the concept of social welfare tax expenditures and how they are similar to direct expenditures, Edward Berkowitz gives the example of, “if a person owes $100 in taxes to the government and the government forgives the obligation on the condition that the person buy a health insurance policy, then the situation is the same as if the government itself spent the $100.” Each expenditure also targets a specific portion of the population in an effort to give the selected population some type of relief.

== Structure of the hidden welfare state ==
The hidden welfare state is almost half the size of the visible welfare state. In 1995, the government spent 900 billion dollars on the visible welfare state and 400 billion dollars on tax expenditures via corporate welfare, military welfare, and social welfare. The hidden welfare state provides goods and services directly comparable to those provided in the visible welfare state of direct spending. Similar to public assistance and social insurance programs of the visible welfare state, there are tax expenditures for corporations, military contractors, Wall Street, income security, health, employment and training, housing, education, and social services. The United States government spends as much, or more, on social services and on employment training through the tax code as it does through direct spending.

The Earned Income Tax Credit is an example of when the Treasury provides cash directly to individual taxpayers with no restrictions concerning the type of good or service individuals can purchase or when they can use the cash. In general, the government uses the tax code to entice market actors to consume in socially desirable ways. Tax expenditures include financial incentives to encourage employers and individuals to purchase goods like health care, housing and child care. Tax expenditures also subsidize public programs, such as Social Security, which basically benefit all citizens, although the Social Security Administration notes that poorly paid workers benefit the most from this particular program, Social Security.

As David A. Rochefort, a Northeastern University professor, points outs, “the most significant function in the hidden welfare state is income security, accounting for roughly half of all expenditures, and the single most important program of this tax supports employer-provided pensions. Exclusion of employers' health insurance contributions from corporate taxation represents another leading area of expenditure that when combined with retirement initiatives, adds up to an enormous public subsidy for employers and their workers." These large subsidies on employer benefits are one reason affluent citizens tend to benefit from the hidden welfare state the most. These plans and benefits are usually available in larger companies, unionized companies, and better paying occupations. Also, tax expenditures often benefit activities that the less affluent can not afford to engage in, such as owning a home. The majority of tax expenditures go to people who earn more than the median income. Who benefits from the visible welfare state seems to be more equal; most benefits of the visible welfare state go to people with average income. Christopher Howard's research reveals that one quarter of direct spending goes to public assistance and three-quarter goes to social insurance and that the visible welfare state serves a far greater proportion of individuals below the poverty line than does the hidden welfare. Only about 5 percent of tax expenditures are targeted at people at or near the poverty line. Many Americans are aware of the national housing policies that help the poor through subsidized rent or public housing, however, it is misleading to think of U.S. housing programs as small and only targeted at the poor. Many middle and upper-class people benefit from housing programs because most housing programs are administered through the tax code rather than appropriations. The U.S. government spends twice as much on housing tax expenditures as on traditional housing programs. As Thomas Shapiro, author of The Hidden Cost of Being African-American, points out, the fact that most Americans are not aware of the many housing tax expenditures that the government provides shows that these programs are "ingrained and taken for granted by home owner subsidies have become, as opposed to the intense annual scrutiny programs assisting needy families receive."

== Origins ==
The visible welfare state was primarily formed during two major periods, the mid-1930s and the mid-1960s. In the first period the Social Security Act was created and Medicare, Medicaid, and a variety of social service, education, and job training programs that targeted the poor was created during the second period. Although the visible welfare state was formed in these two big bursts, the hidden welfare state has been steadily created throughout the twentieth century. The federal government began creating tax expenditures in the twentieth century. Since the 1910s at least two tax expenditures have been created each decade. Even during periods of resistance to social policy initiatives in the late 1910s and 1920s, tax expenditures were created. In the 1930s tax expenditures passed that exempted benefits from public programs created during the New Deal. In the 1940s, 1950s, and 1960s tax expenditures related to housing and health care passed. Since the 1960s tax expenditures have been passed that offer individuals alternative sources of income and targeted a variety of needs of low-income taxpayers.

Throughout American history the enactment of direct spending social welfare programs has caused debate, controversy and resistance. However, history shows that the tax expenditures associated with the hidden welfare state have been fairly easy to enact. They have been enacted at a steady rate and have not been the result of social movements or mass protest. A reason tax expenditures have been able to be enacted without much debate is simply because many people did not know about them. These items were not included in the governments until after 1969. As Edward Berkowitz explains, "people who wanted to know the value of, say, the mortgage deduction needed to do the calculations themselves, making an esoteric subject that much more arcane." Moderate and conservative members of United States Congress have been the main people behind many of the tax expenditures that make up the hidden welfare state, which is ironic because they are usually seen as antagonistic to new social programs. Christopher Howard points out that "the tax expenditure for corporate pensions had probably the quietest start of any major social program in contemporary welfare state. It was approved without debate late one night as Congress worked out the details of the Revenue Act of 1926." The Earned Income Tax was created during the debates over the Family Assistance Plan. However, although the Family Assistance plan generated a lot of attention, there was little debate over the Earned Income Tax when it was passed.

Tax expenditures have also had an easier time being passed than direct expenditures because tax expenditures are funded and authorized by the same congressional committee in each house, whereas direct spending programs are not. In order for a direct spending program to be passed, new legislation has to be passed. However, tax expenditures are also usually added to legislation in must pass revenue bills created by the revenue committees. For example, the Targeted Jobs Tax Credit was passed as an amendment to the Revenue Act of 1978. Howard also claims that tax expenditures have "inherent ambiguity" and that they are "able to gain diverse support because tax expenditures are often ambiguous in terms of their clientele (serve, workers, employers, service providers), and in terms of their purpose (social welfare, economic stimulation, labor support, political constituency, and more."

== Politics of hidden welfare ==
Attention has recently been brought to the "hidden welfare state" because Howard and others believe it negatively impacts numerous aspects of society. In terms of social programs, the US's social welfare state is smaller than many European countries. The United States has yet to institute some of the most common European social welfare programs, such as universal health care. However, if the hidden welfare state of tax expenditures with social objectives is taken into account, the American welfare state is actually much larger.

Knowledge about the hidden welfare state is also important because it shows that a larger portion of the U.S. population benefits from welfare than it is usually believed. Many of the social welfare programs are targeted to help lower-income families, who have throughout history been racial minorities, such as African Americans. Socio-economic and racial issues such as those have both caused controversy and a stigma to be attached to social assistance programs. In contrast to the reasons for that stigma, wealthy and poor beneficiaries of many of the aforementioned tax expenditure programs are net-contributors to IRS receipts, unlike many of those who receive "visible" welfare, i.e. the portion who are receiving it due to long-term unemployment. Nonetheless, many affluent whites benefit from the welfare state, too, through tax expenditures related to retirement saving, charitable contributions (although these often help those in need of "visible" welfare, not only the philanthropist), higher education, and home ownership.

The argument on the other side would be that those receiving "hidden welfare" have an amount that is supposed to be paid in taxes but is credited back whereas those receiving visible welfare do not have an amount that is supposed to be paid in taxes and receive additional welfare. One produces a theoretical loss (those getting the tax deductions) and the other an actual loss (those receiving welfare without paying in more than 100% of benefits).

== See also ==
- Constitutional economics
- Corporate welfare
- Public welfare
- Welfare (financial aid)
- Welfare
