= Christian Howard =

Christian Howard may refer to:

- Christian Howard (theologian) (1916–1999), British Christian theologian
- Christian Howard (actor) (born 1984), British actor, model and martial artist
- Christian Howard (footballer) (born 1991), Australian rules footballer
- Chris Howard (pitcher) (born Christian Howard, 1965), American baseball pitcher

== See also ==
- Chris Howard (disambiguation)
