= Christopher Howard (professor) =

American political scientist

Academic background
- Education: Duke University (BA); Massachusetts Institute of Technology (PhD)

Academic work
- Discipline: Political Science
- Institutions: College of William & Mary

Christopher Howard (born 1961) is an American political scientist. His scholarship focuses on the history and politics of social policy in the United States, with particular attention to what he has termed the "hidden welfare state" of tax expenditures. Howard is currently the Pamela C. Harriman Professor of Government and Public Policy at the College of William & Mary, where he has taught since 1993.

Howard has published several books on the United States' welfare state. He has also written opinion pieces and been interviewed widely on U.S. social policy topics for outlets including The Washington Post, CNN, The Hill, the Richmond Times-Dispatch, The Virginian-Pilot, and National Public Radio stations including WNYC and KERA.

== Early life and education ==
Howard was born in 1961. He received a B.A. in History, summa cum laude, from Duke University. He was inducted into Phi Beta Kappa. After leaving Duke, he received a M.A. and a Ph.D. in Political Science at the Massachusetts Institute of Technology.

== Books ==
Published books include:

- Howard, Christopher (2023). Who cares: the social safety net in America. New York, NY: Oxford University Press. ISBN 978-0190074456.
- Howard, Christopher (2017). Thinking like a political scientist: a practical guide to research methods. Chicago ; London: The University of Chicago Press. ISBN 978-0226327686.
- Howard, Christopher (2008). The welfare state nobody knows: debunking myths about U.S. social policy (3. print., and 1. paperback print ed.). Princeton, N.J.: Princeton Univ. Press. ISBN 978-0691138336.
