= Emmanuel Saez =

French economist

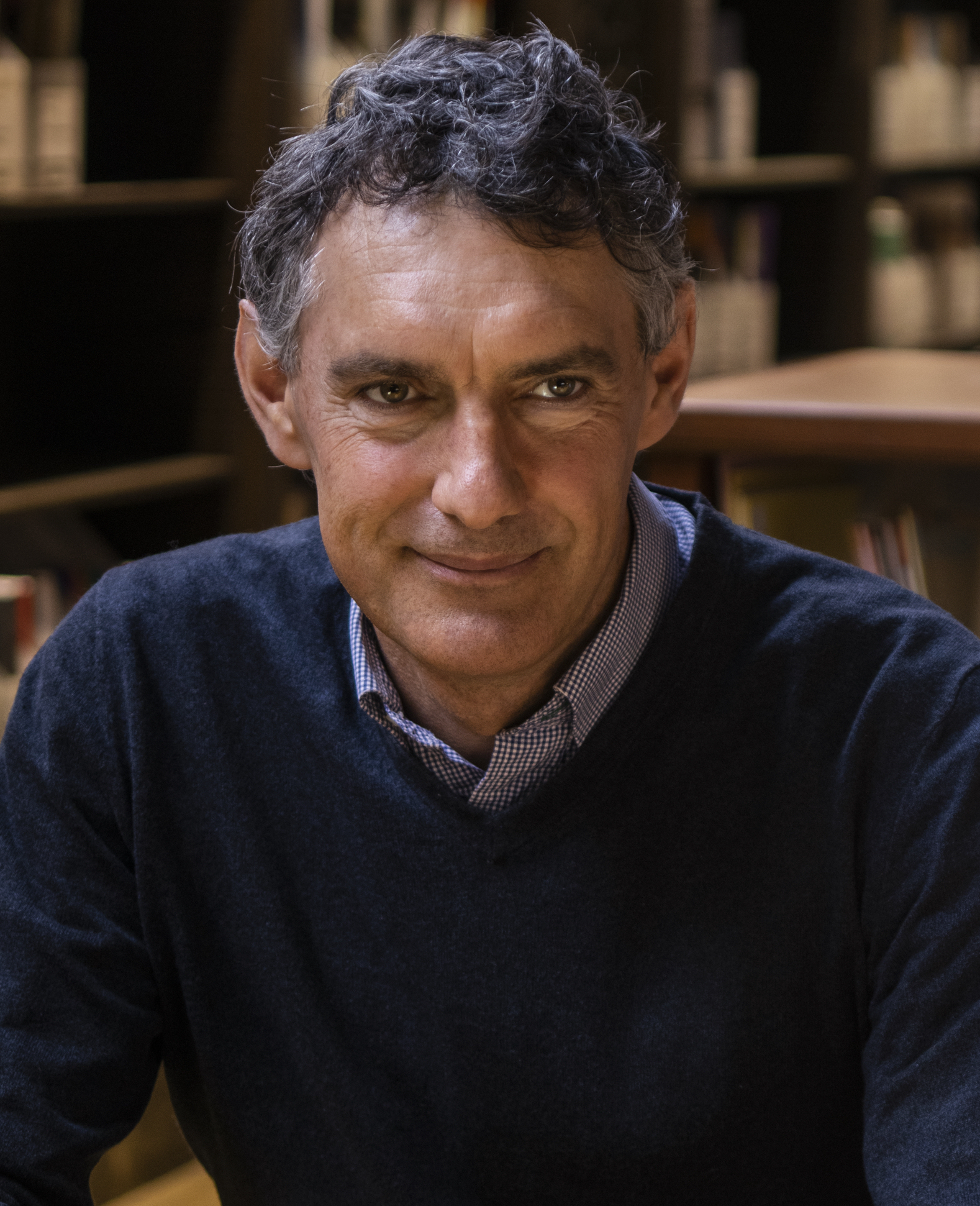
- Saez in 2019
- Born: 1972 (age 53–54)

Academic background
- Education: École normale supérieure Massachusetts Institute of Technology
- Doctoral advisor: James M. Poterba; Peter Diamond
- Influences: Anthony Barnes Atkinson

Academic work
- Discipline: Public economics Economic history
- School or tradition: New Keynesian economics
- Institutions: University of California, Berkeley
- Notable ideas: Research on inequality
- Awards: John Bates Clark Medal (2009); MacArthur Fellowship (2010)
- Website: Information at IDEAS / RePEc

Emmanuel Saez is a French economist who is a professor of economics at the University of California, Berkeley. His work specializes in optimal tax theory and economic inequality including tracking the incomes of the poor, middle class and rich around the world.

Together with economists Thomas Piketty and Gabriel Zucman, Saez's work claims top earners in the United States have taken an increasingly larger share of overall income over the last three decades, with almost as much economic inequality as before the Great Depression. Saez recommends much higher marginal tax rates, of up to 70% or 90%. Among other honors, he received the John Bates Clark Medal in 2009 and a MacArthur "Genius" Fellowship in 2010.

== Education ==
In 1992, Emmanuel Saez ranked 15th in the entrance exam for École polytechnique (often known simply as X in France), France's most prestigious engineering school and 16th for École Normale Supérieure (ENS Ulm); he ultimately chose the latter. He was in the same class as 2010 Fields Medalist Cédric Villani, mathematician Vincent Lafforgue, and physicist Bruno Andreotti. He graduated in mathematics in 1996. He studied economics at School for Advanced Studies in the Social Sciences (EHESS) in Paris.

He then received his Ph.D. in economics from the Massachusetts Institute of Technology (MIT) in 1999.

Between 1999 and 2002, he served as an assistant professor at Harvard University, and later became a professor at the University of California, Berkeley.

== Research ==
Saez has written extensively on the theory of optimal taxation and transfer, addressing topics such as wealth and income inequality, capital income taxation, and retirement. In addition to his theoretical work, he has authored a number of empirical papers, many of them applying the results from his theoretical work to US household data. His focus on the top 0.1% of the income and wealth distribution has led to his political theories about the "great compression" and the "great divergence" and led to significant research on the consensus about the ideal wealth distribution.

Saez's research on wealth and income inequality has largely focused on households at the top of the wealth and income distributions, which make up a significant portion of the US tax base.

Critics, such as James Pethokoukis of the American Enterprise Institute, say that Saez and Piketty measure "market income", the total income before tax excluding income from government. Saez describes it as gross income reported on tax returns before any deductions. This excludes unemployment insurance, welfare payments, food stamps, Medicare, Medicaid, Social Security and employer-provided health insurance. Saez says that these are the best data available, as measured consistently since 1913. Critics say that they exaggerate inequality.

In 2011, Saez and Peter Diamond argued in public media a widely discussed paper that the proper marginal tax rate for North Atlantic societies and especially the United States to impose is 73% (substantially higher than the current 42.5% top US marginal tax rate).

Together with Raj Chetty and others he researched social mobility in the US. They found substantial geographic differences across the country that were correlated with five factors: segregation, income inequality, local school quality, social capital, and family structure.

== Awards ==
=== John Bates Clark Medal ===
He was the recipient of the 2009 John Bates Clark Medal, awarded to "that American economist under the age of forty who is judged to have made the most significant contribution to economic thought and knowledge". Saez's research contributions have been mainly in the field of Public Economics. The 2009 John Bates Clark citation reads:

"[Saez's] work attacks policy questions from both theoretical and empirical perspectives, on the one hand refining the theory in ways that link the characteristics of optimal policy to measurable aspects of the economy and of behavior, while on the other hand undertaking careful and creative empirical studies designed to fill the gaps in measurement identified by the theory. Through a collection of interrelated papers, he has brought the theory of taxation closer to practical policy making, and has helped to lead a resurgence of academic interest in taxation."

=== MacArthur Fellow ===
In 2010, the MacArthur Foundation named Saez a MacArthur Fellow for his research into the connection between income and tax policy.

=== Other Awards ===
The Cercle des économistes, a French economic think tank, presented Saez the 2010 Award for the Best Young French Economist. In 2014, he won the H. C. Recktenwald Prize in Economics. In 2019, he received an honorary doctor of laws degree from Harvard University.

== See also ==
- Inequality in the United States
- Tax policy and economic inequality in the United States
