= Qualified residence interest =

Qualified residence interest is the most significant exception to the limitations imposed by § 163(h) of the Internal Revenue Code.

== Interest deduction generally ==
Sec. 163 of the IRC permits deductions for interest paid or accrued during the taxable year. However, the Tax Reform Act of 1986 severely limited the scope of this interest deduction. In effect, the Tax Reform Act changed § 163 from a general rule for deduction into one of non-deduction with six discreet exceptions. These exceptions, listed in § 163(h)(2), include exceptions for active business interest, taxable investment interest, passive activity business interest, estate tax interest, and education loan interest along with the qualified residence interest.

== Mechanics ==
The mechanics of the qualified residence interest deduction are given in §163(h)(3) of the IRC. In order to use the deduction, the taxpayer must have paid or accrued interest during the taxable year from one of two of the following sources. The interest must be attributable to either 1) acquisition indebtedness, or 2) home equity indebtedness, with respect to any qualified residence of the taxpayer. Acquisition indebtedness is defined as an indebtedness which is incurred in acquiring, constructing, or substantially improving any qualified residence, and is secured by such residence. Home equity indebtedness is defined as any indebtedness secured by a qualified residence to the extent that the aggregate amount does not exceed 1) the fair market value of that qualified residence, minus 2) the amount of acquisition indebtedness with respect to that residence.

== Limitations ==
The aggregate amounts treated as acquisition indebtedness for any period cannot exceed $1,000,000. The amount for home equity indebtedness cannot exceed $100,000. Qualified residence interest is also subject to limitations imposed by § 263(g) - certain interest in the case of straddles, § 264(a)(2) and (4) - interest paid in connection with certain insurance, § 265(a)(2) - interest relating to tax-exempt income, § 266 - carrying charges, § 267(a)(2) - interest with respect to transactions between related taxpayers, § 465 - deductions limited by the amount at risk, § 1277 - deferral of interest deduction allocable to the accrued market discount, and § 1282 - deferral of interest deduction allocable to accrued discount.
