= Predistribution =

Fiscal policy idea

Pre-distribution (or Predistribution) is the idea that the state should try to prevent inequalities occurring in the first place rather than ameliorating them via tax and benefits once they have occurred, as occurs under redistribution.

The term is a neologism coined by Yale University Professor Jacob Hacker in his paper, "The Institutional Foundations of Middle Class Democracy" published by the think tank Policy Network. It has been used in the same sense by authors James Robertson and Joseph Huber in the book, Creating New Money (New Economics Foundation, London, UK). It is also employed in various publications associated with the Campaign for Co-operative Socialism, including a set of five articles published in 2009/2010 by The CCPA Monitor (the publication of the Canadian Centre for Policy Alternatives), and republished in 2010 as a collection, CCPA Readings on Co-operative Socialism.

== Influence on British politics ==
In the United Kingdom, Labour Party leader Ed Miliband showed interest in the concept, telling a Policy Network seminar at the London Stock Exchange that "Predistribution is about saying we cannot allow ourselves to be stuck with permanently being a low-wage economy". The concept has been seen as resulting from a recognition that were Labour to return to government they would not be able to reverse all Coalition cuts and implement traditional redistributive policies due to the poor state of the economy and instead need to focus on policies that make "work pay" for the poorest in society. Tristram Hunt, a Labour MP, called for predistribution in his chapter in The Purple Book as a way to reform the economy whilst having fiscal restraint and fellow Purple Book contributor Rachel Reeves used the term in a June 2012 Progress article. Lord Wood of Anfield, an adviser to Miliband, has argued that the "pre-distribution" agenda is necessary because "In the face of rising inequality, declining social mobility and stagnating real wages for middle-income earners, there are limits to what redistribution can achieve on its own".

In an article in The Guardian, Hacker described the three major themes of predistribution in a UK environment:

- getting the macroeconomy right, particularly by encouraging long-term investment;
- providing good quality public services, particularly healthcare, and investing in the skills of the young;
- discovering new ways to control the market economy, such as worker empowerment, steps beyond the minimum wage, such as the right to know what co-worker groups earn, and the formation of worker groups other than unions.

== Criticism ==
There has been discussion of whether predistribution is practical. BBC Political Correspondent Ian Watson argues that a predistributive policy might, for instance, require a business (when bidding for a government contract) to pay the living wage rather than the national minimum wage, something that might be difficult during times of austerity. However, Watson's argument has been countered by the independent Commission on Living Standards.

Some commentators have gone so far as to suggest that the concept of predistribution has been invented, and lacks any real substance.

== See also ==
- Policy Network
- Blue Labour
- Winner-Take-All Politics
- Distributism
