= Sri Srinivasan =

American federal judge (born 1967)

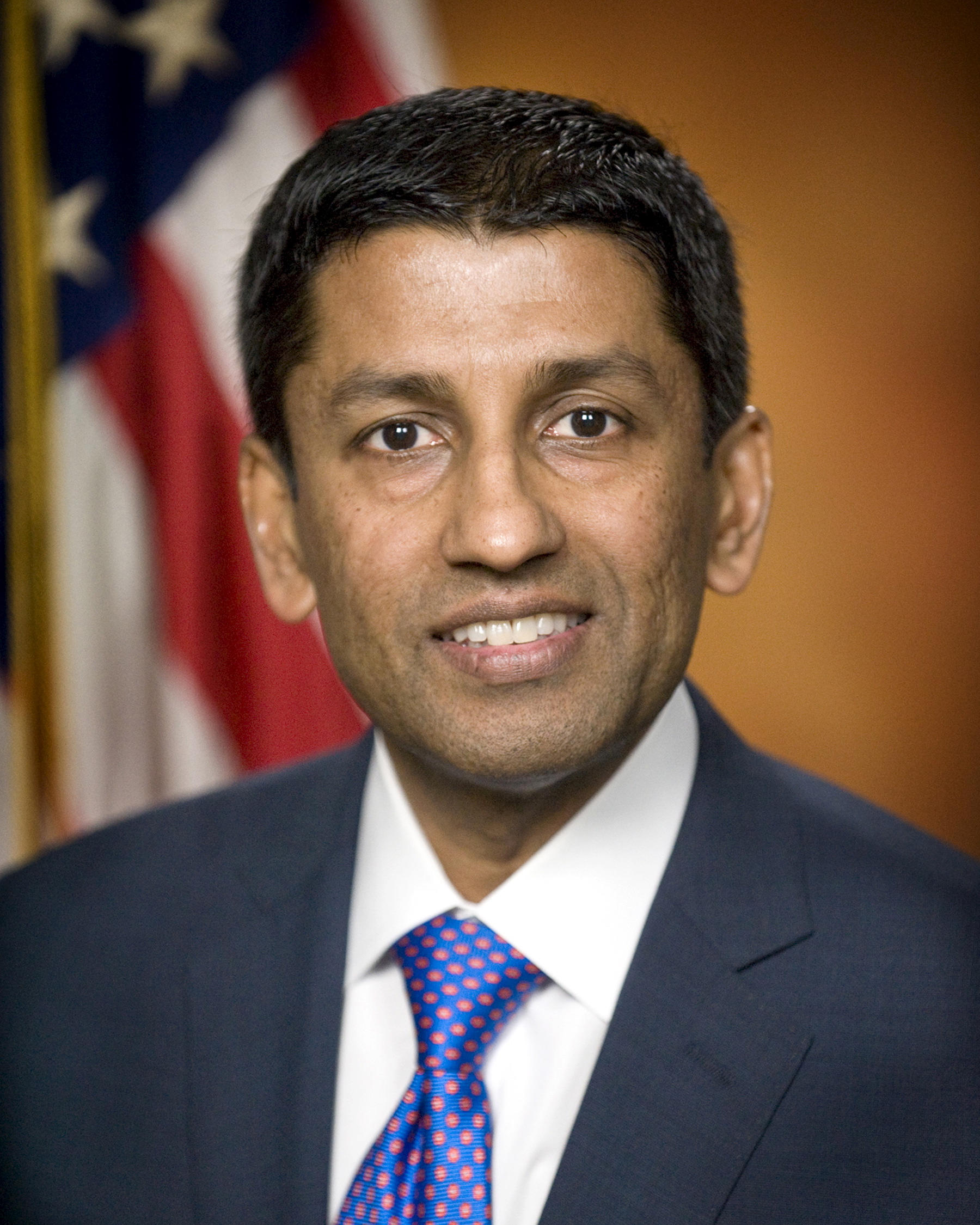
- Official portrait, 2013

Chief Judge of the United States Court of Appeals for the District of Columbia Circuit
- Incumbent
- Assumed office February 11, 2020
- Preceded by: Merrick Garland

Judge of the United States Court of Appeals for the District of Columbia Circuit
- Incumbent
- Assumed office May 24, 2013
- Appointed by: Barack Obama
- Preceded by: A. Raymond Randolph

Principal Deputy Solicitor General of the United States
- In office August 26, 2011 – May 24, 2013
- President: Barack Obama
- Preceded by: Neal Katyal
- Succeeded by: Ian Heath Gershengorn

Personal details
- Born: Padmanabhan Srikanth Srinivasan; February 23, 1967 (age 59) Chandigarh, India
- Education: Stanford University (BA, JD–MBA)

Padmanabhan Srikanth Srinivasan (/ˈsriː ˌsriːniˈvɑːsən/; born February 23, 1967) is an American lawyer and jurist serving since 2020 as the chief judge of the United States Court of Appeals for the District of Columbia Circuit. Before becoming a federal judge, Srinivasan served as principal deputy solicitor general of the United States and argued 25 cases before the United States Supreme Court. He was also a partner at the law firm O'Melveny & Myers and was a lecturer at Harvard Law School.

In 2016, Srinivasan was considered by President Barack Obama as a potential nominee to the Supreme Court of the United States after the death of Antonin Scalia; Obama nominated Merrick Garland instead.

== Early life and education ==
Srinivasan was born on February 23, 1967, in Chandigarh, India. His parents were Brahmin Iyer Hindu Tamils. His father, Thirunankovil Padmanabhan Srinivasan, was from Mela Thiruvenkatanathapuram, a village near Tirunelveli, Tamil Nadu. Srinivasan's family first came to the United States in the late 1960s when his father was a Fulbright scholar at the University of California, Berkeley. After briefly returning to India, the family permanently immigrated to the United States in 1971 when Srinivasan was four years old. They settled in Lawrence, Kansas, where his father became a professor of mathematics at the University of Kansas. His mother, Saroja, taught at the Kansas City Art Institute and later worked at the University of Kansas's computer science department.

Srinivasan graduated from Lawrence High School in 1985, where he played on the school basketball team alongside future NBA star Danny Manning. He then attended Stanford University, graduating in 1989 with a Bachelor of Arts degree with distinction. From 1989 to 1991, Srinivasan worked as a management analyst for the San Mateo County county manager's office. He then jointly attended Stanford Law School and the Stanford Graduate School of Business, receiving a JD–MBA in 1995. As a law student, he was an editor of the Stanford Law Review and graduated with Order of the Coif honors.

== Career ==
After law school, Srinivasan was a law clerk for Judge J. Harvie Wilkinson III of the U.S. Court of Appeals for the Fourth Circuit from 1995 to 1996. He held a one-year fellowship in the Department of Justice's Office of the Solicitor General from 1996 to 1997, then clerked for U.S. Supreme Court justice Sandra Day O'Connor from 1997 to 1998.

From 1998 to 2002, Srinivasan was in private practice as an associate at the law firm O'Melveny & Myers. He then returned to the Office of the Solicitor General, where he worked from 2002 until 2007. He rejoined O'Melveny & Myers in 2007 as a partner and was the firm's hiring partner for its Washington, D.C. office. While at the firm, he represented ExxonMobil for accusations of human rights abuses by hired military personnel at an Indonesian gas plant. In 2010, he represented former Enron executive Jeffrey Skilling in his appeal before the U.S. Supreme Court, which challenged the "honest services" fraud statute and also that Skilling's trial was never moved from Houston. The Supreme Court ruled in favor of Skilling on the "honest services fraud" statute, but rejected the trial location argument.

Srinivasan was also a lecturer at Harvard Law School, where he co-taught a course on Supreme Court and appellate advocacy. In 2005 he received the Office of the Secretary of Defense Award for Excellence from the United States Department of Defense.

On August 26, 2011, Srinivasan was appointed to replace Neal Katyal as Principal Deputy Solicitor General of the United States. As of May 2013, Srinivasan had argued 25 cases before the U.S. Supreme Court. Earlier in his career, he also performed pro bono work for presidential candidate Al Gore during the aftermath of the 2000 presidential election.

In 2013, he was part of the legal team that presented arguments before the Supreme Court against the Defense of Marriage Act in the case of United States v. Windsor. He left the Solicitor General's office on May 24, 2013, when he was commissioned as a federal judge.

=== Federal judicial service ===
In March 2010, National Review blogger Edward Whelan wrote that the Obama administration had been considering nominating Srinivasan to one of two vacancies on the United States Court of Appeals for the District of Columbia Circuit and that the idea of nominating Srinivasan had run into opposition from some Obama supporters because of Srinivasan's work in the U.S. Solicitor General's office during the Bush administration, and union animosity to Srinivasan's corporate clients in private practice.

In June 2012, Obama nominated Srinivasan to the seat on the D.C. Circuit. On January 2, 2013, his nomination was returned to the President, due to the sine die adjournment of the Senate; the next day he was renominated to the same office.

His Senate confirmation hearing on April 10, 2013, was uneventful. His nomination was reported out of committee on May 16, 2013, by an 18–0 vote. A final vote on his nomination took place on May 23, 2013, where he was confirmed by a 97–0 vote. He received his commission on May 24, 2013. He took the oath of office before Chief Judge Merrick Garland in June. At his formal swearing-in ceremony in September, administered by retired Supreme Court justice Sandra Day O'Connor, he took the oath on the Hindu holy book Bhagavad Gita and became the first federal appellate judge of South Asian descent. He became Chief Judge on February 11, 2020.

==== Notable decisions ====
- In Sierra Club v. Jewell, 764 F. 3d 1 (2014), Srinivasan authored the majority opinion in the D.C. Circuit's split decision holding that environmental groups seeking to protect the site of the historic Battle of Blair Mountain possessed Article III standing to challenge the removal of the site from the National Register of Historic Places in federal court.
- Srinivasan authored the D.C. Circuit's decision in Pom Wonderful v. FTC, 777 F.3d 478 (2015), which upheld FTC regulations that require health-related advertising claims be supported by clinical studies while simultaneously trimming the number of studies required on First Amendment grounds.
- In Home Care Association of America v. Weil, 799 F. 3d 1084 (2015), Srinivasan authored the D.C. Circuit's decision reinstating, under Chevron deference, regulations that guarantee overtime and minimum wage protection to home health care workers, citing "dramatic transformation" of the home care industry over the past forty years as reason for the change.
- Srinivasan authored the D.C. Circuit's decision in Hodge v. Talkin, 799 F. 3d 1145 (2015), which upheld a federal law prohibiting demonstrations in the U.S. Supreme Court Building's plaza as justified by the Supreme Court's interest in not giving the appearance of being influenced by public opinion and as consistent with nonpublic forum viewpoint-neutral restrictions, where demonstrations could proceed on nearby public sidewalks.
- In Jarkesy v. SEC, 803 F. 3d 9 (2015), Srinivasan authored the D.C. Circuit's decision holding that the securities laws under the Dodd–Frank Act provide an exclusive avenue for judicial review that plaintiffs may not bypass by filing suit in district court.
- Srinivasan authored the D.C. Circuit's decision in Simon v. Republic of Hungary, Slip Op. (2016), holding that Article 27 of the Foreign Sovereign Immunities Act merely creates a floor on compensation for Holocaust survivors because the text of the 1947 peace treaty between Hungary and the Allies does not bar claims outside of the treaty and because the Allies "lacked the power to eliminate (or waive) the claims of" Hungary's own citizens against their government.
- In a July 6, 2021 ruling, The Judge Rotenberg Educational Center, Inc. v. FDA, Srinivasan dissented when the majority overturned the FDA's ban on shocking devices, which the Judge Rotenberg Educational Center uses to torture autistic and disabled students. "The result of the majority's ruling," he wrote, is to "force" the FDA to either "abolish a highly beneficial use" of a device "so it can stamp out a highly risky one," or to "stomach the highly risky use so it can preserve the highly beneficial one."
- Blassingame v. Trump; In December 2023, Srinivasan authored the D.C. Circuit's unanimous decision in Blassingame v. Trump, holding that former President Donald Trump was not entitled to presidential immunity from civil lawsuits brought by Capitol Police officers and members of Congress over the January 6 United States Capitol attack. Srinivasan distinguished between actions taken as "office-holder" versus "office-seeker," writing that "when a first-term President opts to seek a second term, his campaign to win re-election is not an official presidential act."
- Marin Audubon Society v. FAA, In November 2024, Srinivasan dissented in Marin Audubon Society v. Federal Aviation Administration, in which a 2–1 majority held that the White House Council on Environmental Quality lacks authority to issue regulations implementing the National Environmental Policy Act. The majority opinion, written by Senior Judge A. Raymond Randolph, struck down nearly five decades of CEQ NEPA regulations. Srinivasan's dissent noted that neither party had raised the issue, arguing the court erred both in its conclusion and in its remedy of vacating the regulations. In February 2025, the full court declined to rehear the case, but Srinivasan wrote a statement joined by six other judges suggesting the ruling on CEQ's authority may not be treated as binding precedent.

=== Supreme Court consideration ===
In April 2013, Mother Jones suggested that Srinivasan ultimately might be nominated by President Obama for the Supreme Court of the United States; during the same month, Jeffrey Toobin also opined that should he be confirmed for the D.C. Circuit, he would be Obama's next nominee to the Supreme Court. If he had been nominated, he would have been the first Indian American, first Asian American and first Hindu candidate for the Supreme Court.

Following the death of Supreme Court Justice Antonin Scalia on February 13, 2016, Srinivasan was again widely speculated to be among the most likely contenders to be appointed to fill the seat, prior to the nomination of Merrick Garland. After Senate Majority Leader Mitch McConnell threatened to refuse to consider any Obama appointee to fill the seat in an election year, and split political parties in government, it was thought that Srinivasan, who was confirmed 97–0 in 2013, would be politically difficult to block, had he been nominated.

== Scholarly works ==
- Srinivasan, Sri; Joondeph, Bradley W. (2009). "Business, the Roberts Court, and the Solicitor General: Why the Supreme Court's Recent Business Decisions May Not Reveal Very Much". Santa Clara Law Review. 49: 1103–22.

== See also ==
- Barack Obama Supreme Court candidates
- Joe Biden Supreme Court candidates
- List of Asian American jurists
- List of first minority male lawyers and judges in the United States
- List of law clerks for the eighth seat of the Supreme Court of the United States

Legal offices
Preceded by Arthur Raymond Randolph	Judge of the United States Court of Appeals for the District of Columbia Circuit; 2013–present	Incumbent
Preceded by Merrick Garland	Chief Judge of the United States Court of Appeals for the District of Columbia Circuit; 2020–present	Incumbent
