= Office of the Secretary of Defense Award for Excellence =

U.S. government award

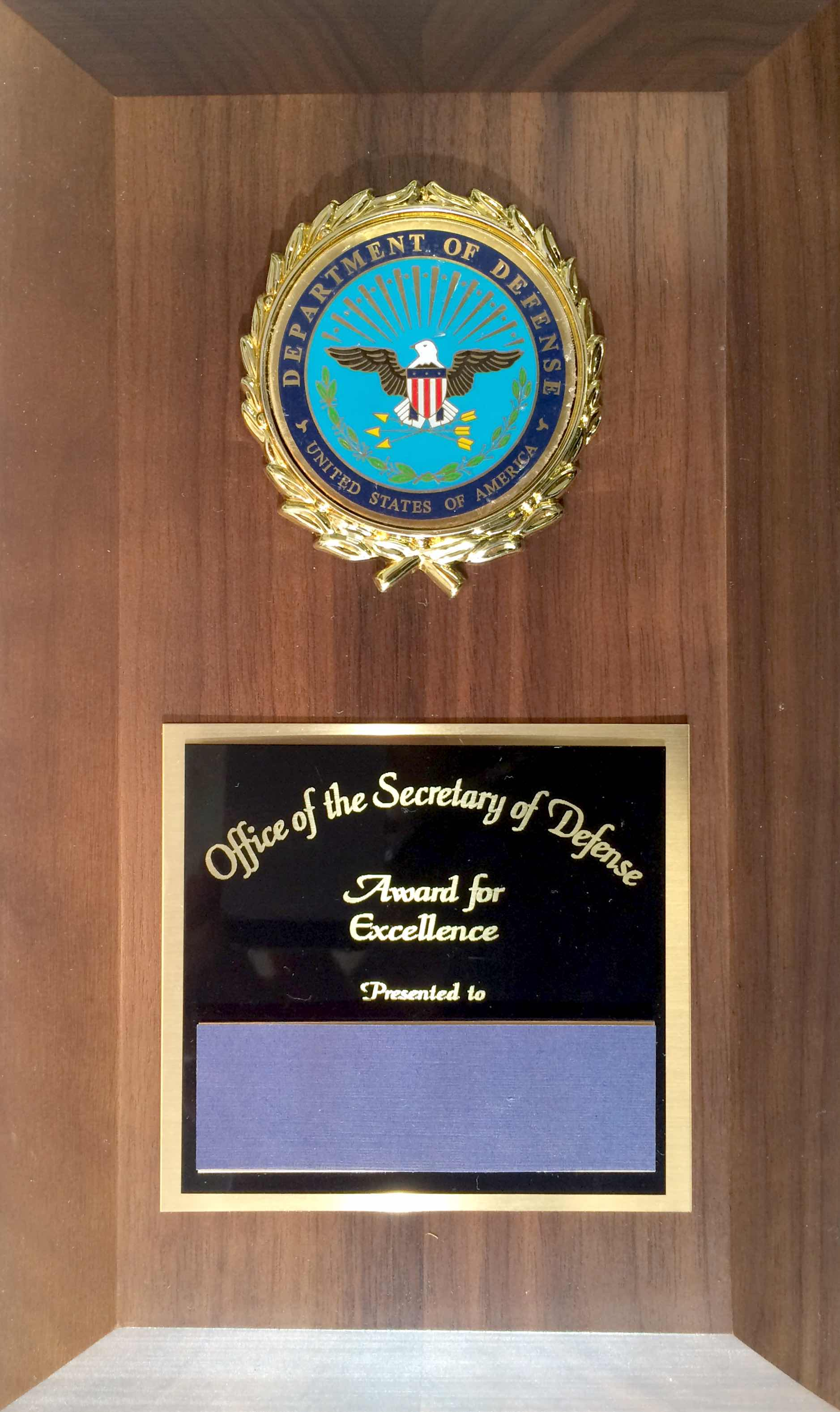
Office of the Secretary of Defense Award for Excellence

The Office of the Secretary of Defense Award for Excellence is an award of the United States government presented by the Office of the Secretary of Defense for civilian service. The award is bestowed on individuals who have made a significant contribution to the mission of the Department of Defense. The Office of the Secretary of Defense is the approval authority. The award consists of an engraved plaque that carries the seal of the United States Department of Defense.

== Notable Recipients ==
- Dr. Barry Boehm
- David McDermott
- Gregory A. Poland, M.D.
- Frank Rose
- Sri Srinivasan
- Oona A. Hathaway
- Mason R. McMaster
- Kenneth W. Taylor
- John L Martin
- Curtis L. Day
- Mark W. Tippett
- Algernon R. Clark
