= Paul Pierson =

American political scientist

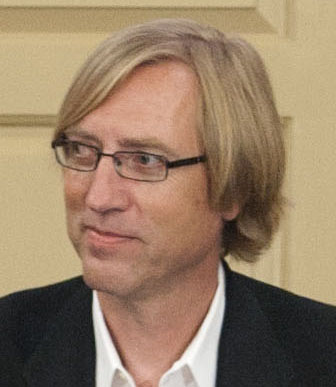
- Born: 1959 (age 66–67); Eugene, Oregon
- Education: Oberlin College (B.A.); Yale University (Ph.D.)
- Known for: Winner-Take-All Politics, • The Transformation of American Politics, • Off Center: The Republican Revolution and the Erosion of American Democracy
- Scientific career
- Fields: Political Science, comparative public policy
- Workplaces: University of California, Berkeley

Paul Pierson (born 1959) is an American professor of political science specializing in comparative politics and holder of the John Gross Endowed Chair of Political Science at the University of California, Berkeley. From 2007-2010 he served at UC Berkeley as Chair of the Department of Political Science. He is noted for his research on comparative public policy and political economy, the welfare state, and American political development. His works on the welfare state and historical institutionalism have been characterized as influential.

== Biography ==
Pierson is a native of Eugene, Oregon, where both of his parents taught at the University of Oregon. He graduated with a B.A. in government from Oberlin College in 1981 and then attended graduate school at Yale University, completing an M.A. and MPhil in 1986 and a PhD degree in political science in 1989.

Pierson taught at Harvard University from 1989 to 2004, when he moved to the University of California, Berkeley. He was a visiting professor at the European University Institute in 1999.

Pierson's first book, Dismantling the Welfare State?, was a revision of his doctoral dissertation and won the American Political Science Association's Kammerer Prize for the best work on American national politics published in 1994. Jacob Hacker described the book as "pathbreaking" and as the start of a substantial scholarly literature on welfare state retrenchment. The book finds that social policy programs in the United States are resilient to fundamental change. The book argues that drastic changes are hard to implement because cuts to social programs entail concentrated costs but diffuse gains, which makes it easier for constituencies that benefit from the social programs to mobilize and impose costs on politicians that seek fundamental changes to social policy programs. He argues that once social policy programs are created, it is hard to repeal them, because powerful constituencies form that depend the social policy programs.

His journal article “Increasing Returns, Path Dependence, and the Study of Politics” won the Heinz Eulau Award for the best article published in the American Political Science Review in 2000. His 2010 book with Jacob Hacker, Winner-Take-All Politics, was a New York Times bestseller. They authored American Amnesia in 2016, which argues for the restoration and reinvigoration of the United States' mixed economy. Their most recent book is Let Them Eat Tweets: How the Right Rules in an Age of Extreme Inequality, published in 2020, argues that Donald Trump and the Republican Party embody a distinct form of populism: plutocratic populism.

Pierson was president of the Politics and History Section of the American Political Science Association for 2003-04.

Pierson is married to Tracey Goldberg, a landscape architect. They live in Berkeley, CA with their two children.

== Selected publications ==
- Let Them Eat Tweets: How the Right Rules in an Age of Extreme Inequality, with Jacob Hacker, New York, NY : Liveright Publishing Corporation, 2020. ISBN 9781631496844
- American Amnesia: How the War on Government Led Us to Forget What Made America Prosper. with Jacob Hacker. Simon & Schuster. 2016. ISBN 978-1-4516-6782-0.
- Winner-Take-All Politics: How Washington Made the Rich Richer--and Turned Its Back on the Middle Class. with Jacob Hacker. Simon & Schuster. 2010. ISBN 978-1-4165-8869-6.
- The Transformation of American Politics: Activist Government and the Rise of Conservatism. 2007. Princeton University Press. (edited with Theda Skocpol).
- Off Center: The Republican Revolution and the Erosion of American Democracy. 2005. Yale University Press. (with Jacob Hacker).
- Politics in Time: History, Institutions, and Social Analysis. 2004. Princeton University Press.
- "Imposing Losses in Pension Policy." 1993. In Do Institutions Matter? Government Capabilities in the United States and Abroad. Brookings Institution Press. eds. R. Kent Weaver, and Bert A. Rockman. (written with R. Kent Weaver).
- "Historical Institutionalism in Contemporary Political Science." In Political Science: The State of the Discipline, eds. I. Katznelson and H. Milner. W.W. Norton. (written with Theda Skocpol).
- The New Politics of the Welfare State. 2001. Oxford University Press. (editor).
- "Increasing Returns, Path Dependence, and the Study of Politics." 2000. American Political Science Review 94(2): 251-267.
- "Not Just What, but When: Timing and Sequence in Political Processes." 2000. Studies in American Political Development 14(1): 73-93.
- European Social Policy: Between Fragmentation and Integration. 1995. Brookings Institution Press. (edited with Stephan Leibfried).
- Dismantling the Welfare State? Reagan, Thatcher and the Politics of Retrenchment. 1994. Cambridge University Press.
