= Jacob Hacker =

American political scientist and adviser

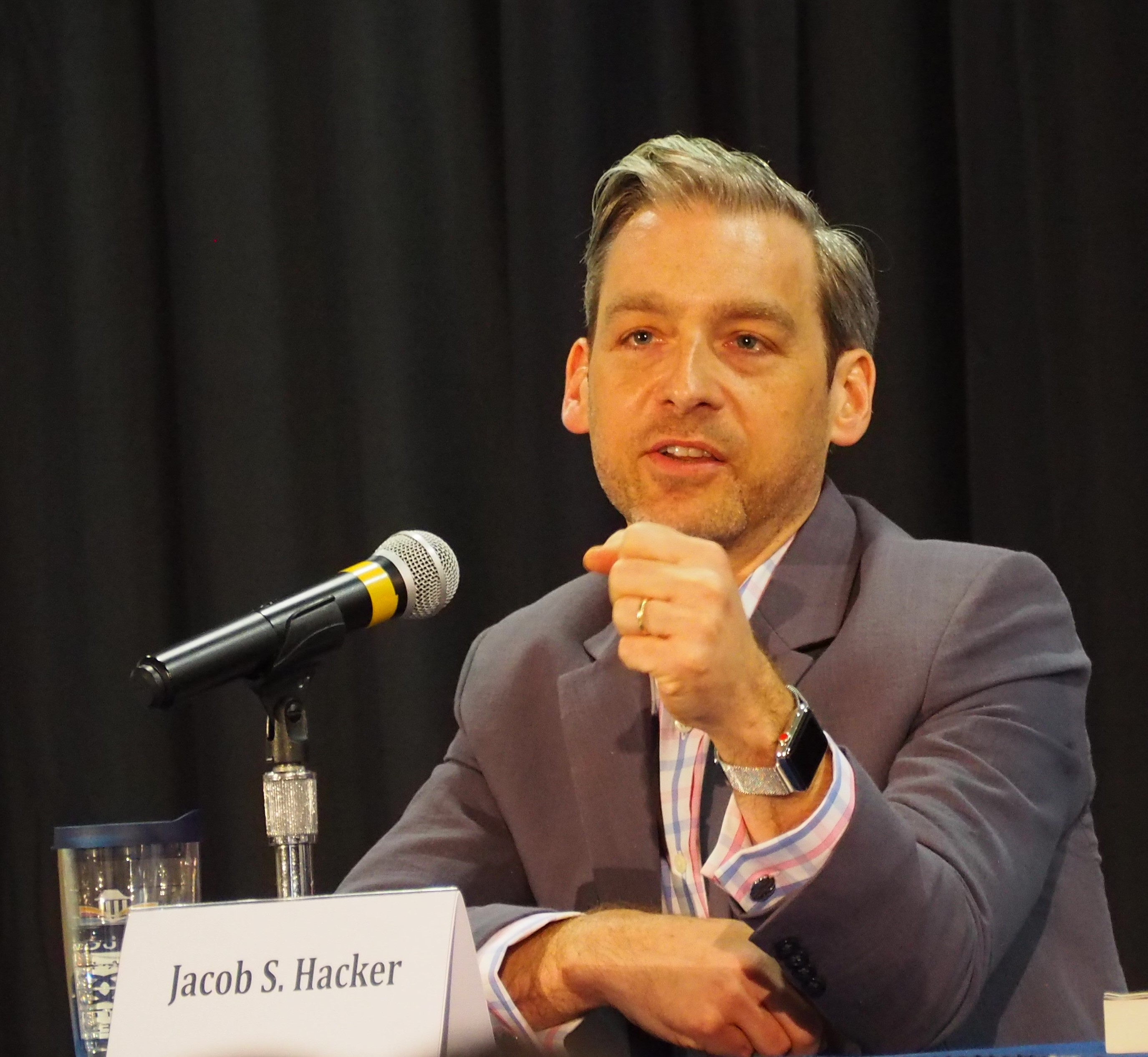
- Born: 1971 (age 54–55); Eugene, Oregon, U.S.
- Spouse: Oona A. Hathaway

Academic background
- Education: Harvard University (BA); Yale University (PhD)

Academic work
- Discipline: Political Science
- Sub-discipline: Health care policy
- Institutions: New America, Yale University

Jacob Stewart Hacker (born 1971) is a professor of political science at Yale University and was formerly director of Yale's Institution for Social and Policy Studies.

He has written works on social policy, health-care reform, and economic insecurity in the United States.

== Early life and education ==
Hacker was born and raised in Eugene, Oregon. He graduated summa cum laude in 1994 from Harvard University with a B.A. in social studies, and he received his Ph.D. from Yale in political science in 2000. His first book, The Road to Nowhere: The Genesis of President Clinton's Plan for Health Security, was published in 1996, while he was a graduate student at Yale.

== Career ==
Jacob Hacker is a media contributor and has testified before the United States Congress. He was widely recognized as a contributor to the health-care plans for three of the leading Democratic candidates — Barack Obama, Hillary Clinton, and John Edwards — in the 2008 presidential election.

Hacker's plan, Health Care for America, is outlined in a report for the Economic Policy Institute. It proposes providing health care for uninsured or under-insured Americans by requiring employers to either provide insurance to their workers or enroll them in a new, publicly overseen insurance pool. People in this pool could choose either a public plan modeled after Medicare or from among regulated private plans.

Hacker's work with the international think tank Policy Network has had a major influence on the policies of many European political parties, and his concept of pre-distribution has become a cornerstone of the UK Labour Party's economic policy; his name was even mentioned by Prime Minister David Cameron during Prime Minister's Questions in the House of Commons.

Hacker was a fellow at New America in 1999 and 2002. In 2007 he co-chaired the National Academy of Social Insurance's conference, "For the Common Good," and oversees a Social Science Research Council project on the "privatization of risk."

Hacker's 2010 book, the New York Times bestseller Winner-Take-All Politics: How Washington Made the Richer Richer--and Turned Its Back on the Middle Class (Simon & Schuster), written with Paul Pierson of UC Berkeley, argues that since the late 1970s the American middle and working classes have fallen further and further behind economically because policy changes in government favor the rich and super-rich.

Their 2016 book American Amnesia: How the War on Government Led Us to Forget What Made America Prosper argues for the restoration and reinvigoration of the United States mixed economy.

In 2017, he was elected a Fellow of the American Academy of Arts and Sciences.

=== The Economic Security Index (ESI) ===
In July 2010 the Economic Security Index was launched. Developed by Hacker and a multi-disciplinary research team with support from the Rockefeller Foundation, the ESI measures the share of Americans who experience at least a 25 percent decline in their income from one year to the next and who lack an adequate financial safety net to replace this lost income.

== Personal life ==
Hacker is married to Oona A. Hathaway, a Professor of Law at Yale University and former Supreme Court clerk to Sandra Day O'Connor.

== Works ==
- Let them eat Tweets : how the right rules in an age of extreme inequality, with Paul Pierson, New York, NY : Liveright Publishing Corporation, 2020. ISBN 9781631496844
- American Amnesia: How the War on Government Led Us to Forget What Made America Prosper. with Paul Pierson. Simon & Schuster. 2016. ISBN 978-1-4516-6782-0.
- Winner-Take-All Politics: How Washington Made the Rich Richer--and Turned Its Back on the Middle Class. with Paul Pierson. Simon & Schuster. 2010. ISBN 978-1-4165-8869-6.
- Health at Risk: America's Ailing Health System--and How to Heal It. Columbia University Press. 2008. ISBN 978-0-231-14602-9.
- The Great Risk Shift: The New Economic Insecurity and the Decline of the American Dream. Oxford University Press. 2008. ISBN 978-0-19-533534-7.
- The Great Risk Shift: The Assault on American Jobs, Families, Health Care, and Retirement--And How You Can Fight Back. Oxford University Press. 2006. ISBN 978-0-19-517950-7.
- Off Center: The Republican Revolution and the Erosion of American Democracy. with Paul Pierson. Yale University Press. 2005. ISBN 978-0-300-10870-5.
- The Divided Welfare State: The Battle over Public and Private Social Benefits in the United States. Cambridge University Press. 2002. ISBN 978-0-521-01328-4.
- The Road to Nowhere: The Genesis of President's Clinton's Plan for Health Security. Princeton University Press. 1996. ISBN 978-0-691-04423-1.

== See also ==
- Pre-distribution
- Policy Network
