= Oona A. Hathaway =

American professor and lawyer (born 1972)

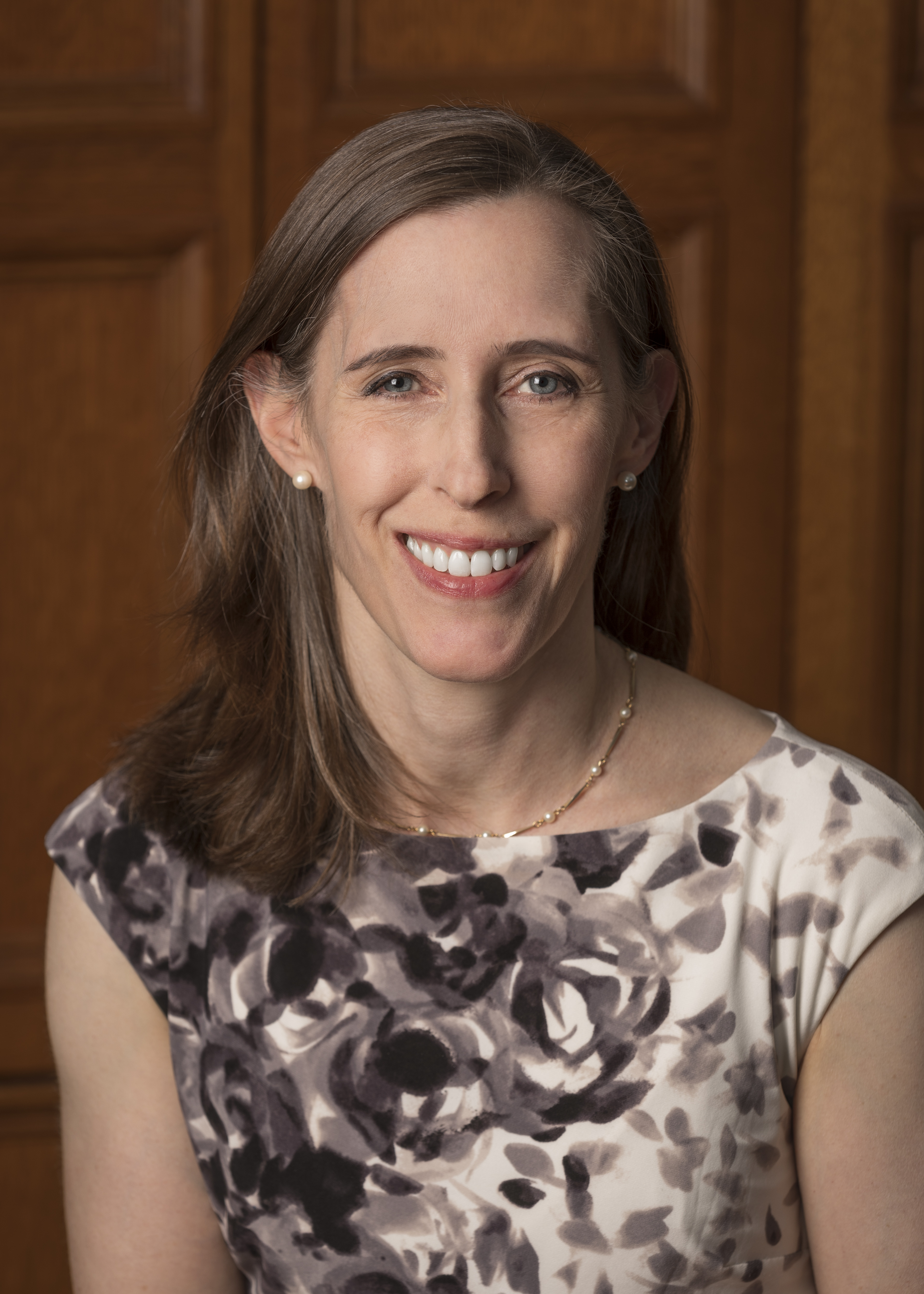
- Born: Oona Anne Hathaway; 1972 (age 53–54); Portland, Oregon, U.S.
- Occupations: Legal scholar, author
- Title: Gerard C. and Bernice Latrobe Smith Professor of International Law at Yale Law School
- Spouse: Jacob S. Hacker

Academic background
- Education: Harvard University (BA); Yale University (JD)

Academic work
- Discipline: Legal scholar
- Sub-discipline: International law
- Institutions: Yale Law School (2002–2008, 2009–present); UC Berkeley School of Law (2008–2009); Boston University School of Law (2000–2002)
- Main interests: Treaties, international and constitutional law
- Notable works: The Internationalists: How a Radical Plan to Outlaw War Remade the World (with Scott J. Shapiro)
- Website: Yale Law School

Oona Anne Hathaway (born 1972) is an American legal scholar specialized in international law and U.S. foreign relations law. Hathaway is the Gerard C. and Bernice Latrobe Smith Professor of International Law at Yale Law School, Professor of the Yale University Department of Political Science, Professor at the Jackson School of Global Affairs, and Director of the Yale Law School Center for Global Legal Challenges. She is also a nonresident scholar at the Carnegie Endowment for Peace, a member of the Council on Foreign Relations, and a member of the American Academy of Arts and Sciences. In 2014-15, she took leave to serve as Special Counsel to the General Counsel at the U.S. Department of Defense. She is the president-elect of the American Society of International Law.

== Early life and education ==
Hathaway was born and raised in Portland, Oregon. While in high school, she participated in the We the People and Mock Trial programs as a student at Lincoln High School, where she was also student body president.

She received her B.A. summa cum laude from Harvard University in 1994; She was a member of Phi Beta Kappa, a John Harvard Scholar, and on the Dean’s List. Furthermore, at Harvard, she received the Thomas Temple Hoopes Prize, the Gerda Richards Crosby Prize, and the Elizabeth Agaziz Award. Hathaway received her J.D. from Yale Law School in 1997, where she was editor-in-chief of the Yale Law Journal, the managing/articles editor of the Yale Journal of International Law, and participant in the Lowenstein International Human Rights Clinic.

== Career ==
Hathaway began her teaching career at Boston University School of Law in 2000. In 2002, she joined the Yale Law School faculty, where she is now the Gerard C. and Bernice Latrobe Smith Professor of International Law. She also holds appointments in the Yale University Department of Political Science and has held faculty roles in the Yale Faculty of Arts and Sciences and the Jackson School of Global Affairs. She is the founder and director of the Yale Law School Center for Global Legal Challenges.

Since 2005, Hathaway has served on the Advisory Committee on International Law for the Legal Adviser of the U.S. Department of State. From 2014 to 2015, she served as Special Counsel to the General Counsel for National Security Law at the U.S. Department of Defense, for which she received the Office of the Secretary of Defense Award for Excellence. She previously clerked for Justice Sandra Day O'Connor of the U.S. Supreme Court and Judge Patricia Wald of the U.S. Court of Appeals for the D.C. Circuit. She is admitted to practice law in New York, Washington, D.C., and Connecticut.

Hathaway has held visiting academic appointments at Harvard Law School, the University of Toronto Faculty of Law, and Sciences Po in Paris. She has also served as Counselor to the Dean of Yale Law School (2017–2022), chaired the Yale Law School Faculty Clerkship Committee, and served on Yale’s Budget Advisory Group. She is also a non-resident scholar at the Carnegie Endowment for International Peace.

In 2025, Hathaway was elected President-Elect of the American Society of International Law (ASIL). She is expected to begin her two-year term as president in 2026. In 2025, she was elected to the American Academy of Arts and Sciences and was awarded a Guggenheim Fellowship. She was also named a Berlin Fellow at the American Academy in Berlin in 2025 and awarded the Berlin Prize.

== Personal life ==
Hathaway is married to Jacob Hacker, professor of political science at Yale University. They have two children.

== Scholarship ==
Hathaway is a leading scholar in international law, national security law, and the constitutional allocation of war powers. Her work examines the intersection of domestic and international legal systems, with a focus on the law of armed conflict, treaty law, and executive authority.

She is co-author, with Scott J. Shapiro, of The Internationalists: How a Radical Plan to Outlaw War Remade the World (2017), which explores the legacy of the Kellogg–Briand Pact and its influence on modern prohibitions on the use of force. The book was named a New York Times Book Review Editors’ Choice, included in The Economist's "Books of the Year," shortlisted for the Lionel Gelber Prize, and received the Scribes book award from the American Society of Legal Writers. It has been translated into Chinese, Japanese, Italian, and Spanish.

Hathaway is also co-author, with Harold Koh, of Foundations of International Law and Politics (2004), and serves as a Reporter for the Restatement (Fourth) of the Foreign Relations Law of the United States, published by the American Law Institute.

She is a founding editor and Executive Editor of the national security law forum Just Security, where she regularly writes on issues including international humanitarian law, U.S. foreign relations law, and international institutional reform. She also writes often for publications such as The Washington Post, The New York Times, and Foreign Affairs.

From 2019 to 2023, Hathaway was listed among the top 5 most-cited legal scholars in the United States in the fields of international law, national security, and foreign affairs. She was the only woman in the top 10 and the youngest person featured on the citation list. Additionally, she is among the top 10 most-cited legal scholars in any field born in 1970 or later.

=== Books ===
- The Internationalists: How a Radical Plan to Outlaw War Remade the World (with Scott Shapiro) (2017, Simon & Schuster)
- Foundations of International Law and Politics (with Harold H. Koh) (Foundation Press 2004)

== See also ==
- List of law clerks for the eighth seat of the Supreme Court of the United States
