= R. Kent Weaver =

American political scientist

Kent Weaver is a professor at Georgetown University and a senior fellow in Governance Studies at the Brookings Institution. His focus is on a variety of fields in U.S. political science, including comparative social policy, comparative political institutions, and the politics of expertise. Weaver joined the Georgetown Public Policy Institute in the fall of 2002, after 19 years at the Brookings Institution. Before coming to Brookings, Weaver taught in the Political Science Department at the Ohio State University for several years. He received his B.A. from Haverford College and his Ph.D. in Political Science from Harvard University.

Weaver's focus is on understanding how political institutions, past policy choices and the motivations of politicians interact to shape public policy choices. Much of his work has attempted to understand when and why politicians undertake actions that appear to offer more political risks than rewards, and how they attempt to avoid blame when they do so, popularly known as blame avoidance. From 2002 to 2002, he served as co-director of the Welfare Reform & Beyond Initiative at Brookings, which sought to build a better understanding of social science research findings among policymakers and advocates in the lead-up to congressional debate on reauthorization of welfare reform legislation. He is currently completing a book on what the United States can learn from the experiences of other advanced industrial countries in reforming their public pension systems. He is also writing another book on how states have implemented welfare reform legislation in the United States.

== Education ==
- B.A. Haverford College, Political Science
- Ph.D. Harvard University, Political Science

== Selected publications ==
- Weaver, R. Kent. 2000. Ending Welfare as We Know It. Washington, DC: Brookings Institution Press.
- Weaver, R. Kent. 1998. "The Politics of Pension Reform: Lessons from Abroad," In R. Douglas Arnold, Micheal Graetz, and Alicia Munnell, eds., Framing the Social Security Debate: Values, Politics, and Economics. Washington, DC: National Academy of Social Insurance, p. 183-229.
- Weaver, R. Kent. 1988. Automatic Government: The Politics of Indexation. Washington, DC: Brookings Institution Press.
- The Politics of Industrial Change (Brookings, 1985)
- The Collapse of Canada? (Brookings, 1992)
- Do Institutions Matter?: Government Capabilities in the U.S. and Abroad (Brookings, 1993)
- Think Tanks and Civil Societies (TransAction Publishers, 2000)
- The Government Taketh Away: The Politics of Pain in the United States and Canada (Georgetown University Press, 2003)
