= Policy Network =

International think tank

- Type: Think tank
- Headquarters: Westminster, London, England
- President: Peter Mandelson
- Co-chairs: Lord Liddle, Patrick Diamond
- Website: www.policynetwork.org

Policy Network was an international progressive think tank based in London. Its president was Peter Mandelson, and its chairperson was Lord Liddle.

It organized debates and conducted research on policy and political challenges, and sought progressive solutions to the challenges of the 21st century and the future of social democracy. In May 2021, Policy Network merged with Progress to form Progressive Britain.

== Funding ==
Policy Network has been given a C grade for funding transparency by Who Funds You?

== Publications ==
- Giddens, Anthony (2009). Politics of Climate Change. Cambridge, UK: Polity. ISBN 9780745646923.
- David Held and Angus Fane Hervey, "Democracy, climate change and global governance", 2009
- David Hetherington and Tim Soutphommasane, "What's the Story? Nation-building Narratives in Australian Climate Politics", 2010
- Priya Shankar, "Old Player, New Role? India in a Multi-polar World", 2010
- Lauren M. McLaren, "Cause for Concern? The Impact of Immigration on Political Trust", 2010
- Patrick Diamond and Giles Radice, "Southern Discomfort Again", 2010
- Alfredo Cabral and Priya Shankar, "Brazil Rising: The Prospects of an Emerging Power", 2011
- Graeme Cooke, Adam Lent, Anthony Painter, and Hopi Sen, "In the Black Labour: Why Fiscal Conservatism and Social Justice Go Hand-in-hand", 2011
- Colin Crouch, "Is There a Liberalism Beyond Social Democracy?", 2011
- Jacob Hacker, "The Institutional Foundations of Middle Class Democracy", 2011
- Rebalancing What?, Mariana Mazzucato, 2012
- On Growth, Larry Summers, 2012
- Stephen Hockman, "Legislating for Responsible Capitalism", 2012
- "Immigration, Work and Welfare", Elena Jurado, Grete Brochmann, and Jon Erik Dølvik (eds), 2013
- Damian Chalmers, "Democratic Self-Government in Europe", 2013
- Roger Liddle, "The Europe Dilemma: Britain and the Drama of EU Integration", 2014
- Sofia Vasilopoulou, Mixed feelings: Britain's conflicted attitudes to the EU before the referendum, 2015
- Patrick Diamond and Giles Radice, Can Labour Win?, 2015
- Britain's EU renegotiation: the view from our partners, 2015
- Claudia Chwalisz and Patrick Diamond, The Predistribution Agenda, 2015
- Pat McFadden and Andy Tarrant, What would 'out' look like?, 2015
- Roger Liddle, Baron Liddle, The Risk of Brexit, 2015
- Andrew Duff, Britain's special status in Europe, 2016
- Greg McClymont and Andy Tarrant, Towards a New Pensions Settlement, 2016
- Daniel Sage, Young people at risk: Challenges and policy options for the UK, 2016
- Jake Sumner, Building for Generation Rent, 2016
- Frans Timmermans, Community: Discovering Ties That Bind, 2016
- Helen Thompson and Leila Simona Talani, The impact of Brexit on the City and the British economic model, 2016
- Jonathan Ashworth, Sunny Ways: Learning from Success and Failure in Canada, 2016
- Matthias Machnig and Oliver Schmolke, Distributing the Future, 2016
- Andrew Duff, After Brexit, 2016
- Lucia Quaglia and Waltraud Schelkle, EU economic governance after Brexit, 2016
- Florian Ranft, Martin Adler, Patrick Diamond, Eugenia Guerrero, and Matthew Laza, Freeing the Road, 2016

== See also ==
- Post-democracy
- Precariat
- Predistribution
- Third Way
