= Winner-Take-All Politics =

2010 book by Jacob Hacker and Paul Pierson

- Author: Jacob S. Hacker; Paul Pierson
- Publisher: Simon & Schuster
- Publication date: September 14, 2010
- Pages: 357
- ISBN: 978-1-4165-8869-6
- OCLC: 491951058

Winner-Take-All Politics: How Washington Made the Rich Richer—and Turned Its Back on the Middle Class is a 2010 book by political scientists Jacob S. Hacker and Paul Pierson. In it the authors argue that contrary to conventional wisdom, the dramatic increase in inequality of income in the United States since 1978—the richest 1% gaining 256% after inflation while the income of the lower earning 80% grew only 20%—is not the natural/inevitable result of increased competition from globalization, but of the work of political forces. Those at the very top of the economic ladder have developed and used political muscle to dramatically cut their taxes, deregulate the financial industry, and keep corporate governance lax and labor unions hamstrung. Instead of a rising tide lifting all boats, the authors write, "yachts are rising, but dinghies are largely staying put" in America, and "there is reason to suspect that the dinghies are staying put in part because the yachts are rising."

== Themes ==
The authors quote a number of luminaries on the dangers of concentrated wealth and its incompatibility with good government—Theodore Roosevelt (p. 80), Louis Brandeis (p. 81–82), Alexis de Tocqueville (p. 77), the 1st-century Greek historian Plutarch (p. 75) ("An imbalance between rich and poor is the oldest and most fatal ailment of all republics"), and even the father of the free market, Adam Smith (who warned of "great inequality" where "civil government" is "instituted for the defence of the rich against the poor") (p. 82).

=== Increase in inequality ===
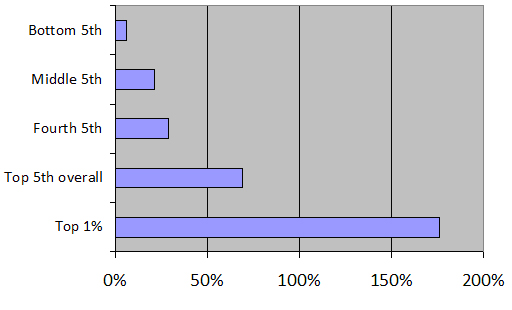
Inflation adjusted percentage increase in after-tax household income for the top 1% and the four quintiles, between 1979 and 2005 (gains by top 1% are reflected by bottom bar; bottom quintile by top bar)

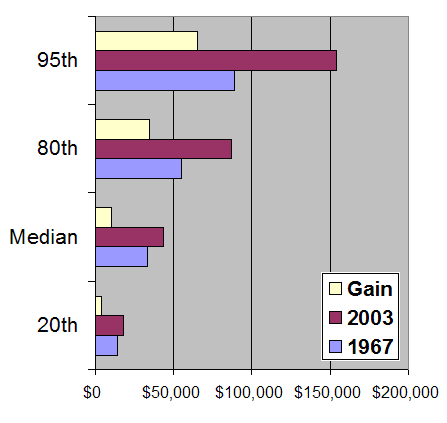
Household income levels and gains for different percentiles in 2003 dollars

Since the late 1970s, inequality of income in America has gotten worse across the board, but it is at the top where income has become most concentrated—concentrated at a level not seen since just before the Great Depression. Most of the gains of economic growth since the 1970s have gone to the top 1% of Americans, and most of that to the top 0.1%. While the share of America's income gains between 1979 and 2005 for the bottom middle- and lower-income 60% of the population was just 13.5% (and most of that gain came from working longer hours), the top 0.1% share was over 20%. In other words, the top 300,000 Americans gained half again as large a slice of income as the bottom 180 million. This after-tax distribution of income varies only slightly when factoring in non-cash compensation (such as health insurance and retirement pensions) distributed.

=== Debunking the "educational cause" ===
"Most economic experts" agree that the 30-year trend in America of greater inequality is a natural economic/historical trend of economic rewards for those with educational achievements and workplace skills. The authors do not. The income distribution has not followed a pattern of "the 29% of Americans with college degrees pulling away" from those who have less education. It is the top 1% that have pulled away from the top 20%, and most especially "the top 0.1% or even 0.01%" that has grown richer than the rest of the population.

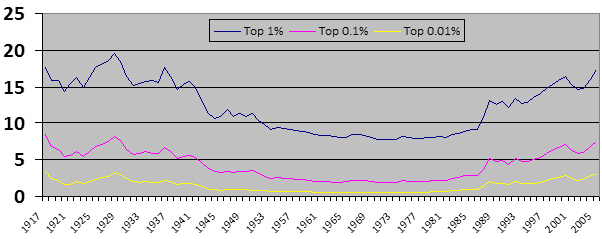
Share of pre-tax household income received by the top 1%, top 0.1% and top 0.01%, between 1917 and 2005

Nor has this rise in inequality taken place in many other developed economies. Western Europe and Japan, "haven't seen anything like the rise in inequality America has." Inequality in France and Switzerland has actually fallen; in Germany it has remained the same; and in Ericsson's Sweden and Sony's Japan it has moved up only slightly.

The relative lack of skill of American workers cannot be blamed, as there is not one. There is no gap between American workers and those of Europeans, Canadians, et al., measured in years of schooling. America's more extreme stratification has not come with any benefit of faster economic growth or more social mobility than its peer countries. Economic growth per capita was essentially the same in the US as that of the 15 core nations of Europe through 2006. America's self-image as the land of the American Dream and rags-to-riches success notwithstanding, the share of those brought up poor or middle class who succeeded in becoming rich (i.e. the social mobility), is now less than in almost all other developed countries.

Two areas related to income distribution where the US differs quite a bit from other developed countries are executive pay and unionization. Unions as a whole have been a force for raising pay and benefits for those with lower income. The percentage of workers belonging to unions has had a marked decline in the US not mirrored in other affluent countries such as America's neighbor Canada, despite a similarity in the "structural features" of the two countries economies and their workers' "propensities to join a union." Increase in the relative pay of CEOs in the US—from 24 times the earnings of the typical worker in 1965 to 300 times in 2007—is much greater than in Europe. It takes a different form than those countries—deferred compensation, "guaranteed hours on corporate jets, chauffeurs, personal assistants, apartments, even lucrative consulting contracts". (This "camouflaged" compensation need not become public knowledge as American business law does not require its reporting.)

==== The top 0.1% ====
Besides corporate executives and managers, the other occupation/industry with large numbers of top earners are professionals in the finance industry. The two groups make up almost 60% of the top 0.1%. (In contrast, entertainment celebrities and sports superstars combined form only 3% of this elite one-household-in-a-thousand.)

While corporate management in America has benefited mightily from its 'capture' from stockholders of boards of directors, whose nomination, pay and perks management has strong influence over. The financial industry's success has come from pushing government to deregulate that industry and making risky investments from which it has privatized the gains and socialized the losses with government bailouts.

=== The "political cause" of inequality ===
Hacker and Pierson describe the political action that has "abandoned the middle class" in the US in favor of making "the rich richer" in the last 30+ years as being the work of "modern, efficient organizations operating in a much less modern efficient political system." Those organizations strove successfully to cut taxes (estate and capital gains taxes) and tax rates for the wealthy, and to eliminate or prevent any countervailing power or oversight of corporate managers—including private litigation, efforts to empower boards of directors and shareholders, the regulation of the Securities and Exchange Commission (SEC) and labor unions.

The action in financial markets, corporate governance, industrial relations, and taxation, came from both changing policy and preventing it from being changed—"drift". Policy changes include tax cuts and legislation such as the 1999 Gramm–Leach–Bliley Act that repealed the Depression-era Glass–Steagall Act and allowed the merger of consumer banks, investment banks, and insurance companies.

Drift, or preventing policy changes to keep "pace with changing economic conditions", included not updating labor laws in response to new corporate anti-union tactics, not enacting stock option regulations in response to changing executive pay packages, and not updating securities regulations in response to the growth of dangerously risky but profitable Wall Street speculation. One example is an attempt in 1993 by Financial Accounting Standards Board (FASB) to "moderate the explosion of CEO pay, not through burdensome interference but through the simple enforcement of honest, transparent accounting" by requiring the expensing of stock options by corporations. They were prevented by "legions of businesspeople" and intervention by congress, led by Senator Joe Lieberman. Another is the "carried-interest" loophole (costing tax payers about $4 billion/year) which allows hedge fund managers—some of the richest people in the US—to pay only 15% tax (the capital gains rate) on income they receive from investors, though the money is a paycheck received for services, not investment income.

=== Politics as "organized combat" ===
Though this process came as part of what the authors describe as a "transformation of American government", it has been overlooked by the public, the media, and recent political science studies. They focus on the more entertaining, fast-moving and easy-to-follow "electoral spectacle" of politicians and their campaigns for office, instead of "what the government actually does"—the more complex, and "frankly boring", organization-driven making of laws and policy. But that the latter is what is really important is reflected in how much more money is spent on lobbying (officially $3 billion a year, unofficially much more) than election campaigns", and the growth in corporate public affairs offices in the nation's capital (100 in 1968, 2500 in 1982).

These highly effective organizations include business groups like Chamber of Commerce, National Federation of Independent Business, (p. 120) anti-tax groups like Club for Growth and Americans for Tax Reform. (p. 208) Along with them came a new generation of think tanks, such as The Heritage Foundation and American Enterprise Institute. Officially non-partisan, they focused on "shifting public opinion and policy" in a conservative direction, rather than traditional 'objective' policy advice.

=== The two parties ===
In the story of a winner-take-all America, the authors believe Republicans wear "black hats" and the Democrats "gray hats". The GOP stands strongly united in favor of policies favoring the wealthy, and becoming ever more extreme through the 1990s and 2000s. Their adherence to tax cuts for the wealthiest Americans exceeds all the other problems—deficit reduction, or tax cuts for the middle- or upper-middle-class—in cases such as the negotiation of the 1997 deficit reduction budget deal. This is not a position Republicans necessarily admit to, or are unaware of public resistance to. In 2001, internal memos told the Bush administration that "the public prefers spending on things like health care and education over cutting taxes", but the GOP went on with a major cut—one-third of which went to the richest 1% of Americans. GOP leaders "appealed openly to bankers for financial support by touting their opposition to financial reform" following the 2008 financial crisis, while "leading GOP strategists" accused Democrats of bailing out Wall Street and "putting taxpayers on the hook", in "'populist' commercials and sound bites" for voters.

In the early 1990s, the minority party in the Senate (often the Republicans) made use of the filibuster to create "something approaching a de facto 'rule of sixty'", whereby 60 votes, rather than a majority, were needed to pass laws. While only about 8% of major bills in the 1960s were filibustered, 70% were from 2000 to 2010. The minority Republican party could and did use the filibuster to make the reformist majority "look ineffectual" and fuel "popular disdain for politics".

Democratic "moderates", and Democrats the authors call "Republicans-for-a-day", aided the Republicans in establishing a winner-take-all system. Moderates, such as Senator John Breaux (who famously insisted that his vote could not be bought—but "it can be rented") and Max Baucus, supported pro-business initiatives such as the Bush tax cut of 2001. Unlike the Republicans—whose members seldom if ever vote with the Democrats, at least in part because the party agenda does not require challenging powerful local interests—it is not uncommon for Democrats to "defect" from their party "on specific economic issues in deference to powerful local interests." Sen. Chuck Schumer (D-NY) is a "strong liberal voice" on any issue except finance, where he works hard for Wall Street interests that are a major part of the New York state economy; California Democrats Dianne Feinstein and Barbara Boxer (D-CA) vote with Republicans when it come to preventing stock option regulations that would impact Silicon Valley workers’ compensation. Sen. Blanche Lincoln (D-AR) includes among her constituents heirs to the Walmart fortune, and supported repeal of the estate tax.

=== Ideas for a solution ===
The authors emphasize the difficulty of undoing the winner-take-all transformation of America. Shrewd, charismatic leaders will not be enough, changing policy will be a "long, hard slog". The issues of stock options, financial deregulation, and tax law, and what to do about them, are "mind-numbingly complex". The rich are highly motivated, focused, and organized. The average voter is ignorant of many of the most basic facts of government, let alone "which policies to support or oppose, which politicians to vote in and out of office."

The 1890–1920 Progressive movement and New Deal serve as models of middle class reform. The way forward will require "continuing, organized capacity to mobilize middle-class voters and monitor government and politics on their behalf."

== Reception ==
=== Critical ===
The book has won praise or compliments from Fareed Zakaria, Robert Solow, Bob Herbert (New York Times), Justin Fox (Harvard Business Review), Ed Kilgore, (Washington Monthly), Kevin Drum, (Mother Jones blog), James Fallows, (National Correspondent, The Atlantic Monthly), Elizabeth Warren (Harvard Law School), David Holahan (The Christian Science Monitor), E.J. Dionne, Jr., Robert Kuttner, Thomas B. Edsall.

=== Awards ===
2011 Northern California Book Award for Best Nonfiction. Finalist for the 2011 Hillman Prize for Book Journalism

== See also ==
- Economic inequality
