= Gadsby =

Gadsby may refer to:

- Gadsby (surname)
- Gadsby (novel), a 1939 novel by Ernest Vincent Wright written without using the letter 'E'
- Gadsby, Alberta, a small village in east central Alberta, Canada
- W Gadsby & Son Ltd, a UK supplier of wicker baskets and gift packaging

== See also ==
- Gatsby (disambiguation)
