= Against Equality of Opportunity =

- Author: Matt Cavanagh
- Language: English
- Genre: Political philosophy
- Publisher: Clarendon Press
- Publication place: United Kingdom
- Pages: 232

Against Equality of Opportunity is a 2002 book by Matt Cavanagh. The work is a critique of the doctrine of equal opportunity. Cavanagh argues against the conventional understanding of equal opportunity, in particular both meritocracy and most substantial interpretations of equality, including the idea of ‘equal life chances’. Instead, he argues for a more limited approach of trying to eliminate specific kinds of discrimination (including race discrimination), together with trying to provide enough opportunities, and help to access them, such that most people have some degree of control over their lives.

== Criticism ==
=== Allegations of racism ===
The book caused some controversy when the author was appointed as an adviser to then Labour Minister David Blunkett when it was revealed that the book argued that it was sometimes rational (in an economic sense) for white employers to discriminate against black applicants

This led to widespread calls for Cavanagh to be sacked, with questions tabled in Parliament, and the affair rumbled on for a few days. The Guardian's letters page carried a balance of letters for and against Cavanagh.

=== Reviews and academic reaction ===
The book received positive reviews in the Times Educational Supplement The Spectator, and in academic journals including Ethics, Notre Dame Philosophical Reviews, Theory and Research in Education and Contemporary Political Theory.

Other reviews were more mixed, including the London Review of Books, The Independent, Philosophical Books and Political Studies Review and Utilitas, the latter two arguing that the work does not adequately engage other scholarly literature relating to equality of opportunity by authors such as Joel Feinberg or George Sher.
