= Walter Gadsby =

Walter Gadsby may refer to:

- Walter Gadsby (footballer, born 1872), English footballer for Small Heath
- Walter Gadsby (footballer, born 1882), English footballer for Chesterfield
