= Economic mobility =

Ability to improve one's economic status

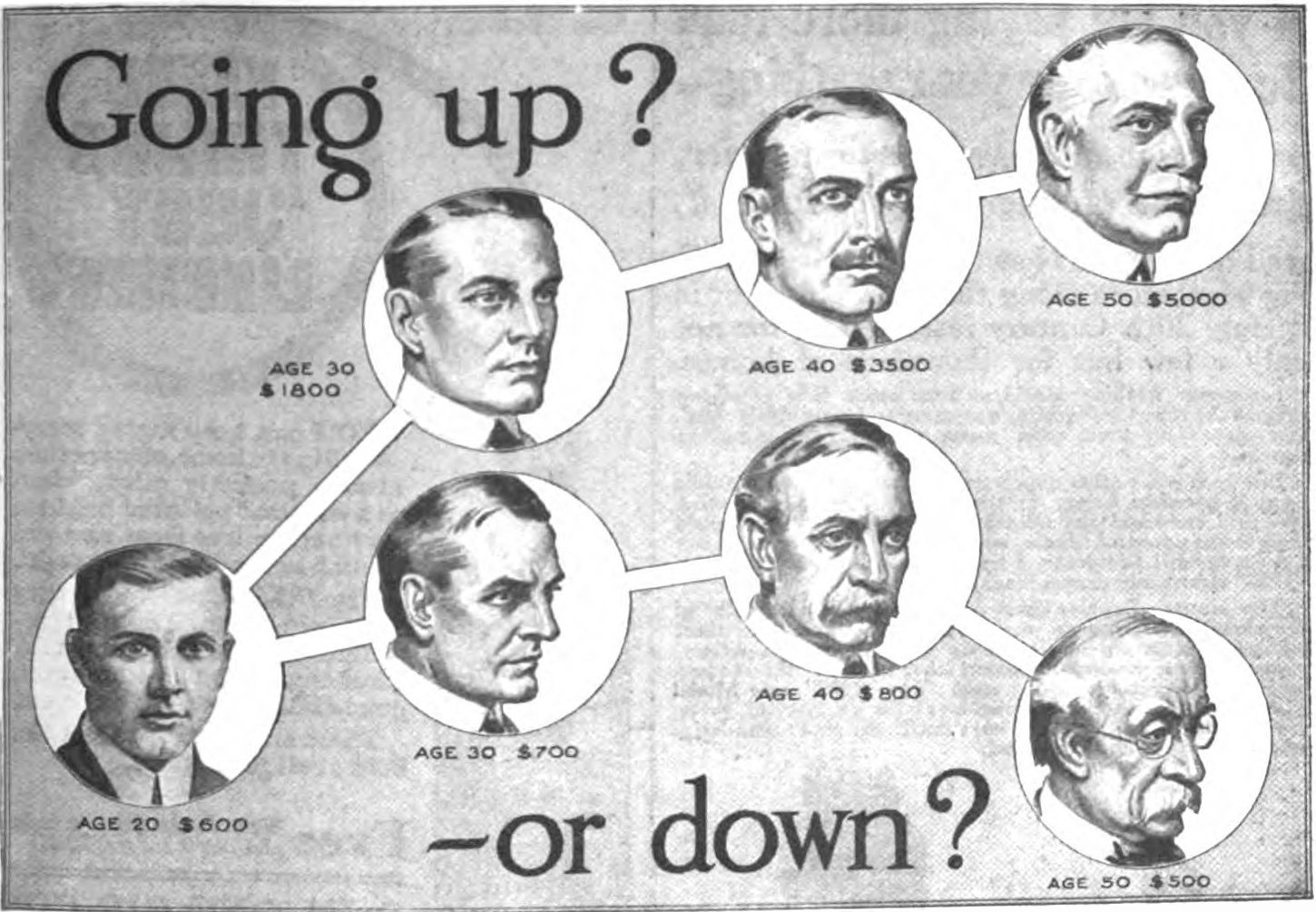
Illustration from a 1916 advertisement for a vocational school in the back of a US magazine. Education has been seen as a key to economic mobility, and this advertisement appealed to Americans' belief in the possibility of self-betterment, as well as threatening the consequences of downward mobility in the great income inequality existing during the Industrial Revolution.

Economic mobility is the ability of an individual, family or some other group to improve (or lower) their economic status—usually measured in income. Economic mobility is often measured by movement between income quintiles. Economic mobility may be considered a type of social mobility, which is often measured in change in income.

== Types of mobility ==
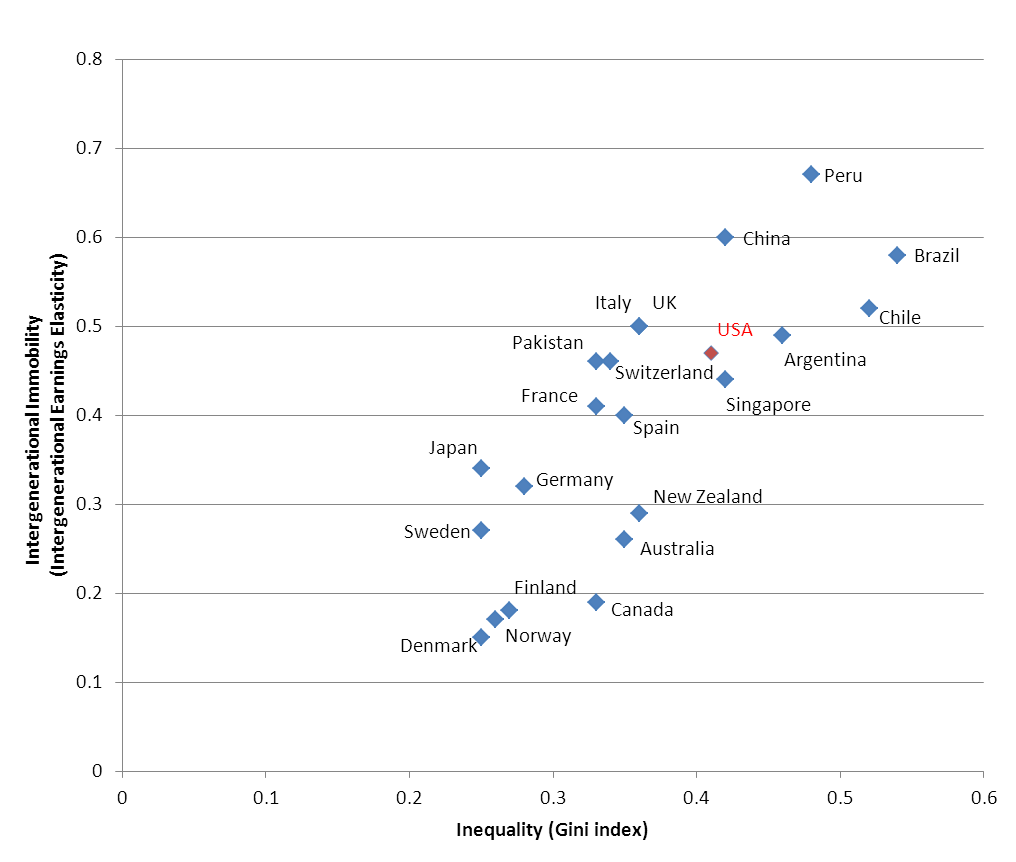
The Great Gatsby Curve. For countries equality of wealth correlates with intergenerational economic mobility.

There are many different ideas in the literature as to what constitutes a good mathematical measure of mobility, each with their own advantages and drawbacks.

Mobility may be between generations ("inter-generational") or within a person's or group's lifetime ("intra-generational"). It may be "absolute" or "relative".

Inter-generational mobility compares a person's (or group's) income to that of their parents. Intra-generational mobility, in contrast, refers to movement up or down over the course of a working career. Absolute mobility involves widespread economic growth and shows to what extent families improve their incomes over a generation. Relative mobility is specific to individuals and groups and it occurs without relation to the economy as a whole. It shows how closely the economic prosperity of children are tied to that of their parents. Relative mobility is a zero-sum game, while absolute is not.

- Exchange mobility is the mobility that results from a "reshuffling" of incomes among the economic agents, with no change in the income amounts. For example, in the case of two agents, a change in income distribution might be {1,2}->{2,1}. This is a case of pure exchange mobility, since they have simply exchanged incomes. More generally, for a set of incomes x_{i}, any permutation of the x_{i} will yield a pure exchange mobility. Measures of inequality (e.g. the Gini coefficient) will not change under pure exchange mobility.
- Structural mobility is mobility that results from a change in the income distribution function without regard to the identity of the agents. For two agents, a change in income distribution might be {1,3}->{2,2}. This case may involve some exchange mobility, depending on one's definition, but there is certainly some structural mobility since it does not involve a simple reshuffling of incomes.
- Growth mobility is mobility that results from an increase in total income. For two agents, a change in income distribution might be {1,2}->{2,4} or perhaps {1,2}->{3,5}.

== By country ==

In recent years, several large studies have found that vertical inter-generational mobility is lower in the United States than in most developed countries. A 1996 paper by Daniel P. McMurrer, Isabel V. Sawhill found "mobility rates seem to be quite similar across countries." However a more recent paper (2007) found a person's parents is a great deal more predictive of their own income in the United States than other countries. The United States had about 1/3 the ratio of mobility of Denmark and less than half that of Canada, Finland and Norway. France, Germany, Sweden, also had higher mobility, with only the United Kingdom being less mobile.

Economic mobility in developing nations (such as those in Africa) is thought to be limited by both historical and global economic factors. Economic mobility is correlated with income and wealth inequality everywhere.

A 2018 World Bank study found that relative income mobility was generally lower in developing regions than in high-income economies. Of the 25 economies in the bottom third of its relative income-mobility distribution, all but one were low- or middle-income countries. The study distinguished income mobility from educational mobility and used a database covering 96 percent of the world's population.

=== United States ===
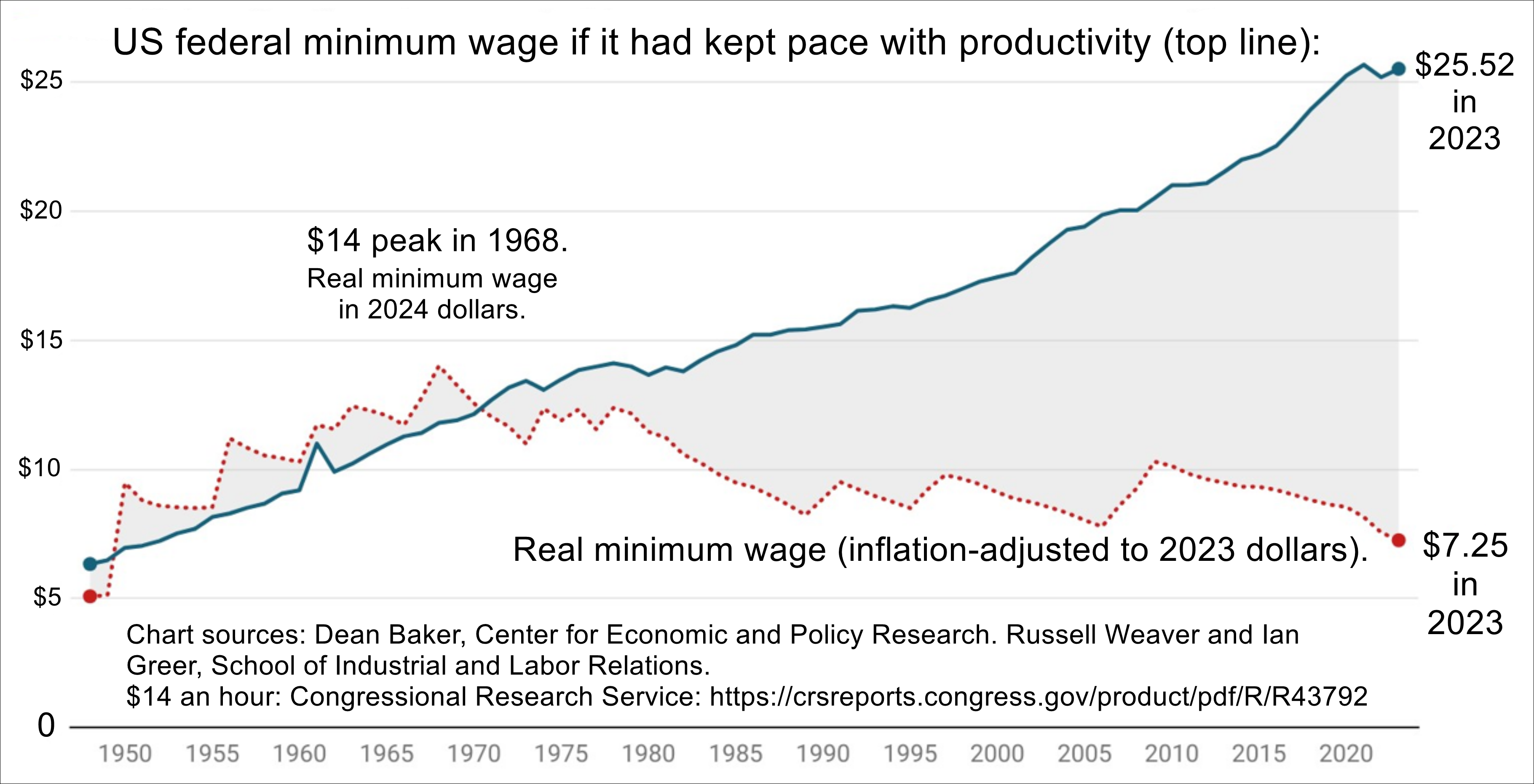
US federal minimum wage if it had kept pace with productivity. Also, the real minimum wage.

==== Intergenerational mobility ====
According to the 2007 "American Dream Report" study, "by some measurements"—relative mobility between generations—"we are actually a less mobile society than many other nations, including Canada, France, Germany and most Scandinavian countries. This challenges the notion of America as the land of opportunity." Other research places the U.S. among the least economically mobile countries.

Another 2007 study ("Economic Mobility Project: Across Generations") found significant upward "absolute" mobility from the late 1960s to 2007, with two-thirds of those who were children in 1968 reporting more household income than their parents (although most of this growth in total family income can be attributed to the increasing number of women who work since male earnings have stayed relatively stable throughout this time).

However, in terms of relative mobility, it stated: "contrary to American beliefs about equality of opportunity, a child's economic position is heavily influenced by that of his or her parents." 42% of children born to parents in the bottom fifth of the income distribution ("quintile") remain in the bottom, while 39% born to parents in the top fifth remain at the top. Only half of the generation studied exceeded their parents economic standing by moving up one or more quintiles. Moving between quintiles is more frequent in the middle quintiles (2–4) than in the lowest and highest quintiles. Of those in one of the quintiles 2–4 in 1996, approximately 35% stayed in the same quintile; and approximately 22% went up one quintile or down one quintile (moves of more than one quintile are rarer). 39% of those who were born into the top quintile as children in 1968 are likely to stay there, and 23% end up in the fourth quintile. Children previously from lower-income families had only a 1% chance of having an income that ranks in the top 5%. On the other hand, the children of wealthy families have a 22% chance of reaching the top 5%.

==== Intragenerational mobility ====
According to a 2007 study by the US Treasury Department, Americans concerned over the recent growth in inequality (after-tax income of the top 1% earners has grown by 176% percent from 1979 to 2007 while it grew only 9% for the lowest 20%) can be reassured by the healthy income mobility in America: "There was considerable income mobility of individuals [within a single generation] in the U.S. economy during the 1996 through 2005 period as over half of taxpayers moved to a different income quintile over this period".

Other studies were less impressed with the rate of individual mobility in the United States. A 2007 inequality and mobility study by Wojciech Kopczuk and Emmanuel Saez and 2011 CBO study on "Trends in the Distribution of Household Income," found the pattern of annual and long-term earnings inequality "very close", or "only modestly" different. Another source described it as the mobility of "the guy who works in the college bookstore and has a real job by his early thirties," rather than poor people rising to middle class or middle income rising to wealth.

==== Relative vs. absolute ====
There are two different ways to measure economic mobility: absolute and relative. Absolute mobility measures how likely a person is to exceed their parents' family income at the same age. Research by the Pew Economic Mobility Project shows that the majority of Americans, 84 percent, exceed their parents' income. However, the size of absolute income gains is not always enough to move them to the next rung of the economic ladder.

A focus on how Americans' rank on the income ladder compares to their parents, their peers, or even themselves over time is a measure of relative mobility. The Pew Economic Mobility Project's research shows that forty percent of children in the lowest income quintile remain there as adults, and 70 percent remain below the middle quintile, meaning 30% moved up two quintiles or more in one generation.

== Causes and issues ==
=== Gender ===
==== Women ====
Women in their 30s have substantially higher incomes today than their counterparts did in their parents' generation. Between 1974 and 2004, average income for women in their 30s has increased almost fourfold. This is a stark contrast to the growth in income of their male counterparts. The employment rate of women in their 30s has increased from 39% in 1964 to 70% in 2004. This sharp increase in income for working women, in addition to stable male salaries, is the reason upward economic mobility is attributed to women.

==== Men ====
The average income of men in their 30s has increased from 31,000 in 1964 to 35,000 in 2004, an increase of only 4,000. The rate of employment for men in this same age group has decreased from 91% in 1964 to 86% in 2004.

=== Social stratification ===
Social connectedness to people of higher income levels is a strong predictor of upward income mobility.

Data shows substantial social segregation correlating with economic income groups.

==== Geographic effects ====
In addition to the generally accepted factors of gender, race, and education, the geography of an individual's upbringing also affects his or her future family income. Understanding the impact of geography on intergenerational income mobility is crucial for comprehensively addressing socioeconomic inequality and promoting economic opportunity across different regions. Policymakers, economists, and social scientists can use these insights to design targeted interventions and policies aimed at reducing inequality and fostering social mobility. Moreover, recognizing the influence of geography on income mobility underscores the broader structural determinants of socioeconomic outcomes, emphasizing the importance of addressing disparities in access to resources, quality education, housing affordability, and economic opportunities across various geographical areas.

According to a 2015 study by Rothwell and Massey, geography and neighborhood conditions do have an impact on intergenerational income mobility. The study found that the influence of neighborhood income on future earnings was about half that of parents' income. It is estimated that if someone born in a lower-class neighborhood grew up in an upper-class neighborhood, their household income would increase by $635,000. These effects become larger when income is adjusted for regional purchasing power, with the neighborhood effect being two-thirds as large as the parental income effect and the lifetime income difference increasing to $910,000. The study considered the impact of housing costs and local government regulations on community quality. Geographic factors as defined by the authors include price growth at national level and hometowns level, differences in house prices between regions, and geographic location. The paper notes that national house price growth may be higher or lower than hometowns price growth, and the differences between regions can be large. It also shows that geography can capture unobserved differences between regions, such as proximity to the coast, weather, proximity to the Mexican border, a history of slavery, or the fact that Western states have a higher proportion of immigrants. In terms of neighborhood conditions, class segregation, average home values, and housing market conditions are included to examine their impact on intergenerational income mobility.

To distinguish the effects of endogenous variables such as education from geographical or neighborhood factors, the authors employ a sophisticated approach. They controlled for individual and household characteristics, including education, and combined metropolitan-level variables to account for regional context and house prices. In doing so, they aim to isolate and measure the specific effects of geographic and community conditions on intergenerational income mobility.

=== Race ===
Average income for both White and Black families has increased since the 1970s. However, average income for White families in their 30s has increased from $50,000 to $60,000 from 1975 to 2005, compared to an increase from $32,000 to $35,000 for Black families of the same age over the same period. So in addition to receiving a lower average income, its growth is also less for Black families (10% growth) than their White counterparts (19% growth). One way this can be explained is that even though marriage rates have declined for both races, Blacks are 25% less likely to be in a married couple. However, Blacks also have less economic mobility and are less likely to surpass their parents' income or economic standing than Whites. Two of three White children born into families in the middle quintile have achieved a higher family income than their parents. Conversely, only one of three Black children born into families in the middle quintile has achieved a higher family income than their parents. On average, Black children whose parents were in the bottom or second quintile do exceed their parents' income, but those whose parents were in the middle or fourth quintile actually have a lower income than their parents. This is a very large difference compared to Whites, who experience intergenerational income growth in every quintile except the highest. This shows that in addition to lower wages with less growth over time, it is less likely for Black families to experience upward economic mobility than it is for Whites.

Redlining intentionally excluded black Americans from accumulating intergenerational wealth. The effects of this exclusion on black Americans' health continue to play out daily, generations later, in the same communities. This is evident currently in the disproportionate effects that COVID-19 has had on the same communities which the HOLC redlined in the 1930s. Research published in September 2020 overlaid maps of the highly affected COVID-19 areas with the HOLC maps, showing that those areas marked "risky" to lenders because they contained minority residents were the same neighborhoods most affected by COVID-19. The Centers for Disease Control (CDC) looks at inequities in the social determinants of health like concentrated poverty and healthcare access that are interrelated and influence health outcomes with regard to COVID-19 as well as quality of life in general for minority groups. The CDC points to discrimination within health care, education, criminal justice, housing, and finance, direct results of systematically subversive tactics like redlining which led to chronic and toxic stress that shaped social and economic factors for minority groups, increasing their risk for COVID-19. Healthcare access is similarly limited by factors like a lack of public transportation, child care, and communication and language barriers which result from the spatial and economic isolation of minority communities from redlining. Educational, income, and wealth gaps that result from this isolation mean that minority groups' limited access to the job market may force them to remain in fields that have a higher risk of exposure to the virus, without options to take time off. Finally, a direct result of redlining is the overcrowding of minority groups into neighborhoods that do not boast adequate housing to sustain burgeoning populations, leading to crowded conditions that make prevention strategies for COVID-19 nearly impossible to implement.

=== Education ===
It is a widespread belief that there is a strong correlation between obtaining an education and increasing one's economic mobility. In the United States, the education system has always been considered the most effective and equal process for all individuals to improve one's economic standing. Despite the increasing availability to education for all, family background continues to play a huge role in determining economic success. To individuals who do not have or cannot obtain an education, the greater overall levels of education can act as a barrier, increasing their chance of being left behind at the bottom of the economic or income ladder. In this regard, education policy that allocates high ability students from lower social economic background to quality schools can have a large impact on economic mobility.

Studies have shown that education and family background has a great effect on economic mobility across generations. Family background or one's socioeconomic status affects the likelihood that students will graduate from high school or college, what type of college or institution they will attend, and how likely they are to graduate and complete a degree. According to studies, when split into income quintiles including the bottom, second, middle, fourth and top, adult children without a college degree and with parents in the bottom quintile remained in the bottom quintile. But if the adult children did have a college degree, there was only a 16% chance that they would remain at the bottom of the quintile. Therefore, it was proven that education provided an increase in economic status and mobility for poorer families. Not only does obtaining a college degree make it much more likely for individuals to make it to the top two quintiles, education helps those who were born in the top quintiles to remain in the top quintiles. Therefore, hard work and increasing education from those who are born into the lower quintiles can boost economic status and help them move ahead, but children born into wealthier families do seem to have the advantage. Even when the likelihood of attending college is ignored, studies have shown that out of all the students that enroll in college, socioeconomic status or family background still has an effect on graduation rates with 53% of those from the top quintile receiving bachelor's degrees along with 39% from the middle and 22% from the bottom quintile. According to the 2002 US Census, students can expect to earn on average about $2.1 million with a bachelor's degree over the course of their working career. That is almost $1 million more than what individual's without a college degree can expect to earn.

Considering that inflation rates have not kept up with increasing tuition rates, disadvantaged families have a much harder time affording college. Especially considering the increased competition for college admittances at public schools, students from lower economic quintiles are at an even greater disadvantage. Tuition rates over the past ten years has risen 47% at public universities and 42% at private universities. While having to take out more loans and work jobs while taking classes, students from lower income quintiles are considering college to be "a test of their endurance rather than their intelligence".

By obtaining an education, individuals with low economic status can increase the income potential and therefore earn more than their parents and possibly surpass those in the upper income quintiles. Overall, each additional level of education an individual achieves whether it be a high school, college, graduate, or professional degree can add greatly to income levels. On the other hand, there are reports that disagree with the idea that individuals can work hard, obtain an education and succeed because there is the notion that America is actually getting poorer and actually more likely to stay poor as compared to any other western country. Some claim that the idea of the "American Dream" is starting to fade since the middle-class family income has remained constant since 1973. But upward mobility clearly still exists. One study claims that economic mobility is 3 times stronger in Denmark, 2.5 times higher in Canada, and 1.5 times higher in Germany as compared to the United States.

=== Migration ===
According to the U.S. Census Bureau, the number of legal immigrants has been rising steadily since the 1960s. The number has increased from about 320,000 to almost a million per year. About 500,000 illegal immigrants also remain in the United States each year. People immigrate to the United States in hopes of greater economic opportunities and most first generation immigrants experience a boost in their income from the American economy. But since most do not have an education, their wages quickly begin to fall relative to non-immigrants. According to studies, there is a great upward jump in economic mobility from the first to the second immigrant generation because of education. These second generation immigrants exceed the income levels of the first generation immigrants as well as some non-immigrants.

Through intergenerational mobility research, the mobility of immigrants and their children from different nations can be measured. Considering relative wages from male workers from certain nations in 1970 to second generation male workers in 2000, conclusions can be drawn about economic mobility. In 1970, if immigrants had come from an industrialized nation, then their average wages tended to be more than the average wages of non-immigrant workers during that time. In 2000, the second generation workers had experienced a downfall in relative mobility because their average wages were much closer to the average wages of a non-immigrant worker. In 1970, for the immigrant workers migrating from less industrialized countries, their average wages were less than the average wages of non-immigrant workers. In 2000, the second generation workers from less industrialized nations have experienced an increase in relative mobility because their average wages have moved closer to those of non-immigrants.

By computing the intergenerational correlation between relative wages of first and second generation workers from the same country a conclusion was made regarding whether or not first generation immigrants influence the wages of the second generation immigrants. This computation was also reported for native-born first and second generation American families. The study found that both immigrants and natives pass along almost exactly the same level of economic advantages or disadvantages to their offspring. These conclusions predict diminishing correlations in wages from the first and second generations if change in the level of education for each immigrant is considered. Since the majority of immigrants have low levels of education, it may be increasingly difficult for future second generation immigrants to ever surpass the average wages of non-immigrants.

== See also ==
- Asset poverty
- De-industrialization crisis
- Social status
- Consumerism
- One-upmanship
- Cycle of poverty
- Status attainment
- Kitchen sink realism
- Polarization (economics)
- Keeping up with the Joneses
- Involuntary unemployment
- Occupational prestige
- Socioeconomic status
- Identity performance
- Economic inequality
- Job Creation Index
- Equal opportunity
- Crab bucket
- Rat race
