= Gadsby (surname) =

Gadsby is a surname. Notable people with the surname include:

- Bill Gadsby (1927–2016), Canadian professional ice hockey player
- Ernie Gadsby (1884–1963), English footballer
- Hannah Gadsby (born 1978), Australian actor and comedian
- Henry Gadsby (1842–1907), English composer and organist
- Jon Gadsby (born 1953), New Zealand television comedian and writer
- Matt Gadsby (1979–2006), English footballer
- Mick Gadsby (born 1947), English footballer
- Nyan Gadsby-Dolly, Trinidad and Tobago politician
- Walter Gadsby (born 1872), English footballer
- Walter Gadsby (1882–1961), English footballer
- William Gadsby (1773–1844), English hymn writer and Baptist pastor
