= The Great Gatsby (disambiguation) =

The Great Gatsby is a 1925 novel by F. Scott Fitzgerald.

The Great Gatsby may also refer to:

== Film and television ==
- The Great Gatsby (1926 film), starring Warner Baxter and Lois Wilson
- The Great Gatsby (1949 film), starring Alan Ladd and Betty Field
- The Great Gatsby (1974 film), starring Robert Redford and Mia Farrow
- The Great Gatsby (2000 film), starring Toby Stephens, Mira Sorvino, and Paul Rudd
- The Great Gatsby (2013 film), starring Tobey Maguire, Leonardo DiCaprio, and Carey Mulligan
- "The Great Gatsby", a 1955 episode of Robert Montgomery Presents
- The Great Gatsby (Playhouse 90), a 1958 episode of Playhouse 90

== Music ==
- The Great Gatsby (opera), a 1999 opera by John Harbison
- The Great Gatsby: Music from Baz Luhrmann's Film, a soundtrack album from the 2013 film
- "Great Gatsby" (song), a 2023 song by Rod Wave
- The Great Gatsby (musical), a 2023 musical by Jason Howland, Nathan Tysen, and Kait Kerrigan
- Gatsby: An American Myth: a 2024 musical by Florence Welch and Thomas Bartlett

== See also ==
- G (2002 film), by Christopher Scott Cherot
- Gatsby (disambiguation)
- The Great Catsby, a South Korean web comic by Doha Kang
- The Great Fatsby, a 1975 album by Leslie West
- Great Gatsby Curve, a chart which plots economic inequality versus social mobility
- The Great Phatsby, two episodes of The Simpsons
