= Hamper =

Type of basket

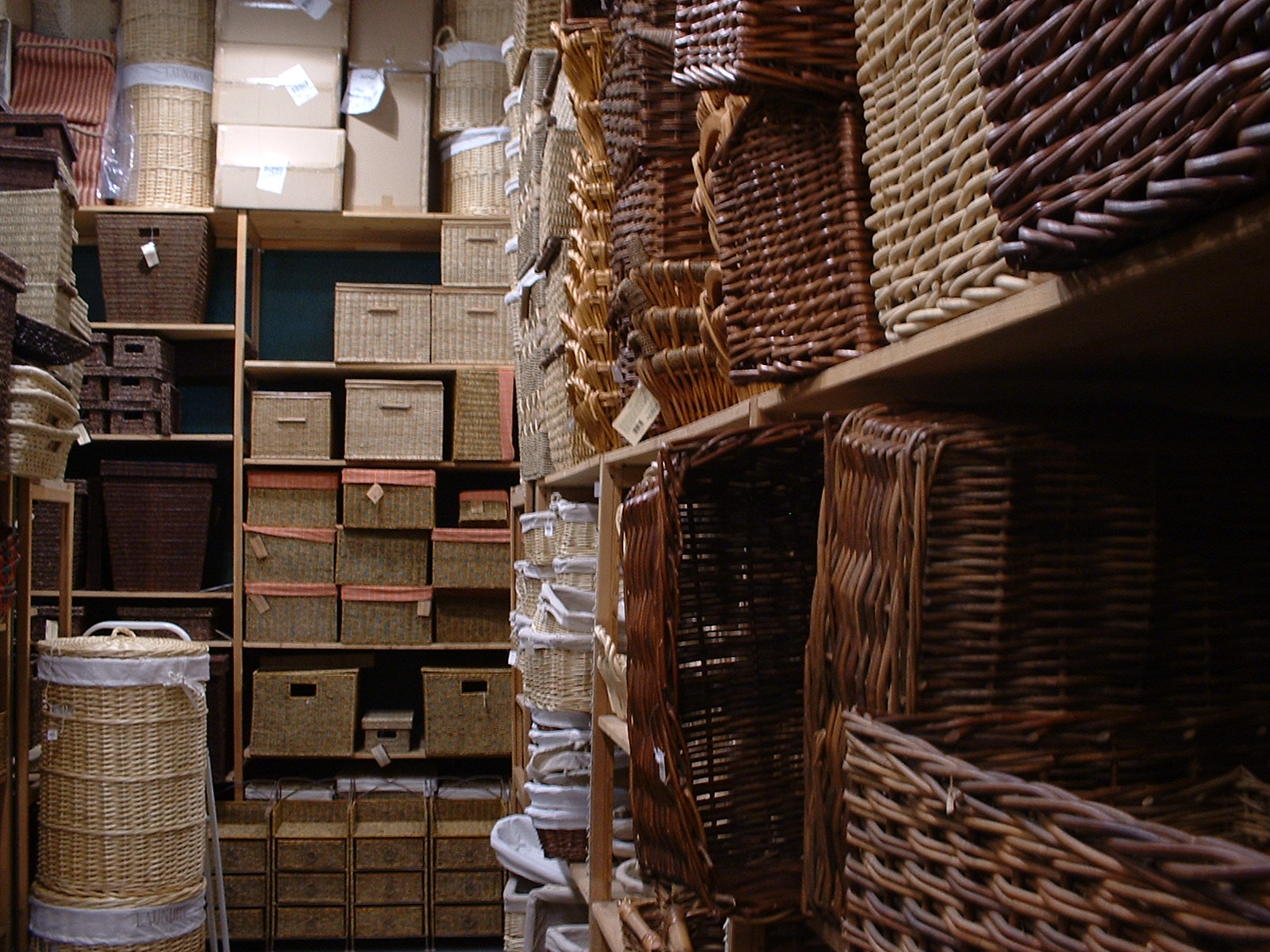
A selection of wicker hampers

A hamper refers to one of several related basket-like items. In primarily British usage, it refers to a wicker basket, usually large, that is used for the transport of items, often food. In North America, the term generally refers to a household receptacle, often a basket, for clean (out of the dryer or off the line) or dirty clothing, regardless of its composition, i.e. "a laundry hamper". Typically a laundry hamper is used for storage and will be sturdier, taller and have a lid while a laundry basket is open and used mainly for transport.

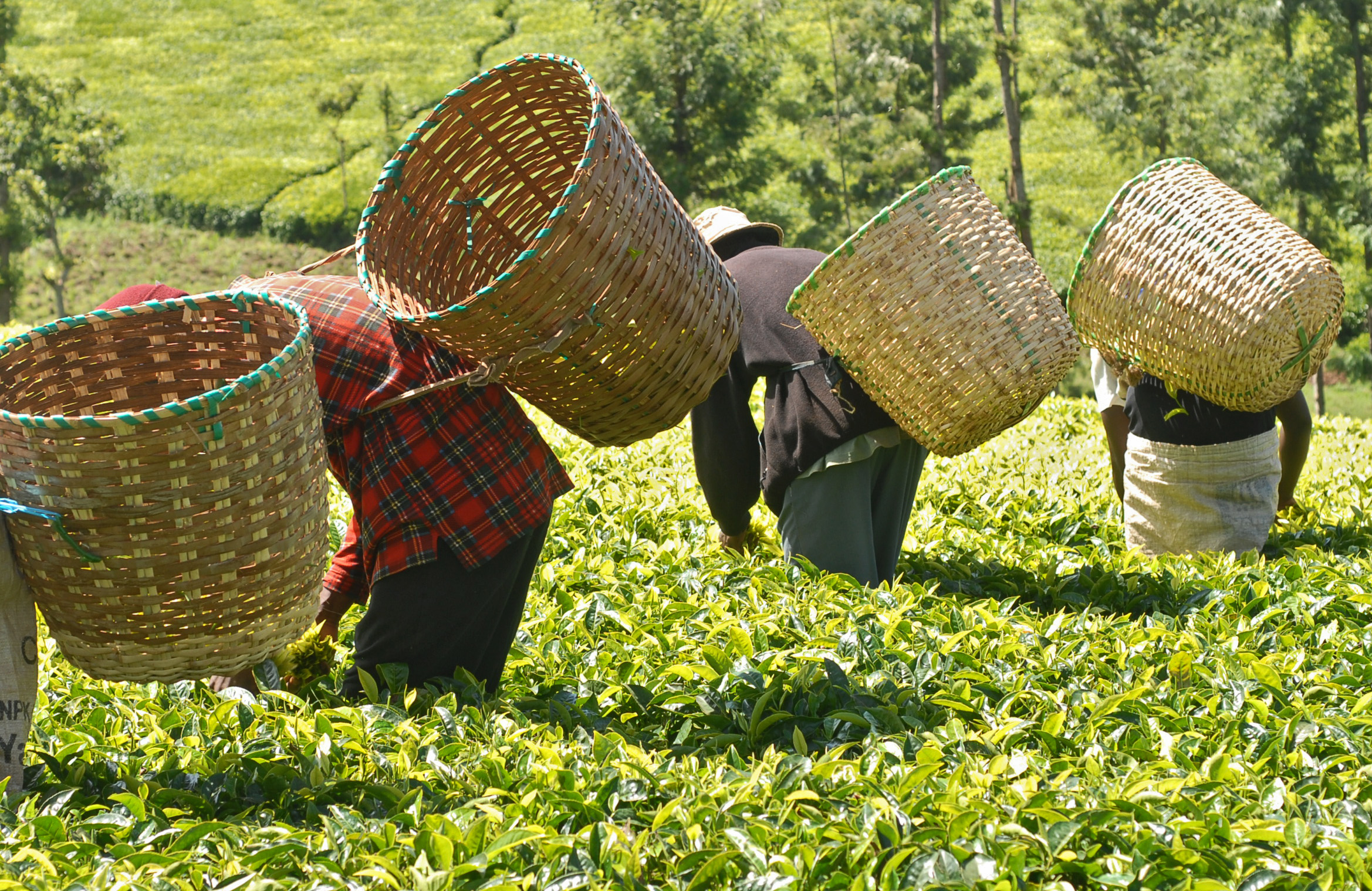
Wide-mouthed harvest baskets used by field workers

In agricultural use, a hamper is a wide-mouthed container of basketwork that may often be carried on the back during the harvesting of fruit or vegetables by hand by workers in the field. The contents of the hamper may be decanted regularly into larger containers or a cart, wagon, or truck.

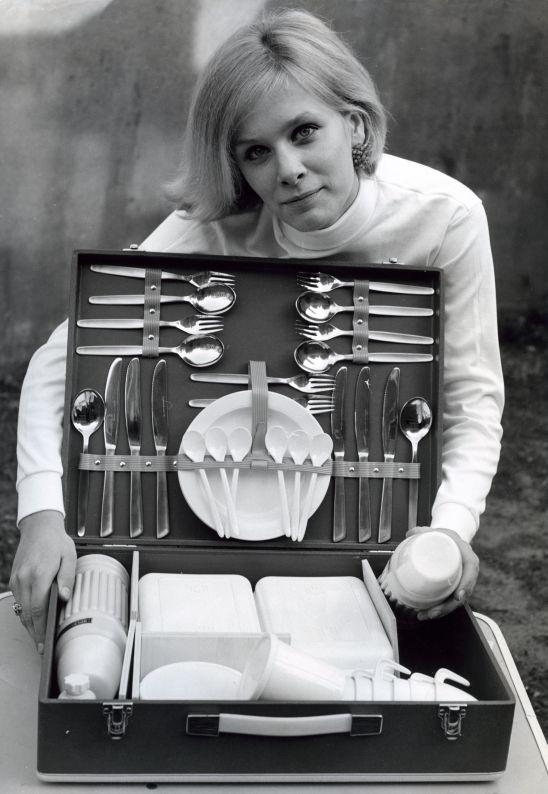
Picnic hamper containing cutlery and crockery

The open ventilation and the sturdiness offered by a hamper has made it suitable for the transport of food, hence the use of the picnic hamper. A picnic hamper often has straps or storage compartments for cutlery and crockery.

At one time it was common for laundry services to leave a large basketwork container with a lid which is now commonly referred to as a clothes hamper. The same type of container would be used to return clean clothing, which would be put away by the laundry service and the empty container left in place of the full container for later pickup. This type of daily or bi-daily hamper service was most common with Chinese laundry services in 19th-century England and America.

The words 'hamper' and 'hampyre' evolved as contractions of the Anglo-French hanaper, from the Medieval Latin hanaperium, which was a secure case for holding a large goblet or cup, and derived from hanapus, the Latin word for a bowl or cup. The first known usage of the word 'hamper' was in the 14th century.

== Charitable hamper ==
There is a long tradition of community and social philanthropy and charity related to hampers, in which persons or community groups donate to needy people a hamper of food, clothing, toiletries, cleaning products, or other household necessities, to assist with their family economy.

Up until the mid 20th century, in the Western tradition, the hamper was a basket that could be carried by the donor and physically handed to the recipient. This limited the size of the gift to food ingredients for at most several days, or other necessities for one to two weeks. The basket itself was a useful item around the house or farm, and any cloth wrapping for the food or lining of the basket would also be usable by the recipient family.

In more recent times, the hamper would likely be a plastic bag or acrylic fibre bag of a size that can be carried, with tinned or packaged goods. A Christmas hamper is likely to be bigger and have some party or celebratory foods, or toys. Hampers can also contain related festive foods.

Charity organisations (both secular and religious organisations) such as the Smith Family, Salvation Army, and Foodbank collect donations of food, toys, and gifts to distribute to people in need at Christmas. The popular Australian tradition of meat raffles swaps to charitable Christmas food and toy hamper raffles at most local clubs and pubs from late November.

== Christmas hamper ==
A Christmas hamper is a traditional gift containing small nonperishable food items, particularly seasonal favorites such as fruitcake or plum pudding, chocolate, nuts, jams, biscuits, honey, smoked or dried meats, and cheese. Some hampers containing tea, coffee, or cocoa might also include a cup and saucer, often seasonally themed or personalized. Luxury hampers may also contain high-end items such as tins of caviar or small bottles of wine. A "fresh hamper" contains perishable items such as fruits, baked goods, or flowers. The tradition of the Christmas hamper may be intended as a special holiday meal for people who might otherwise have no memorable meal to mark the occasion, or for people such as students or isolated people who are unable to join their families for Christmas.

In the US, the Christmas hamper is more usually called a gift basket and does not necessarily contain food items. Non-food gift baskets are frequently themed, such as baskets containing luxury bath items including scented soaps and towels, or beauty baskets with skincare products, perfumes, or lotions. These gift baskets are also popular for occasions other than Christmas.

Christmas hamper contents tend to reflect contemporary notions of luxury, and include a combination of popular food items as well as high-status products considered at the time to be decadent or celebratory. In Australia in 1970, a giant Christmas hamper was offered as a promotion when buying a new car. A photograph taken by Bob Beel shows the hamper contained a collection of canned food, tinned ham, a canned plum pudding, non-perishable everyday pantry items such as custard powder and teabags, as well as longneck bottles of VB beer. A Christmas hamper from Australia in 1992 was packed in a wicker basket for hand delivery and contained a Lion's Christmas cake, Rotary plum pudding, tea, jelly crystals, fruit chutney, and a selection of tinned goods.

Modern Christmas hampers contain the same mix of popular food items and seasonal luxury treats such as plum pudding, Christmas cake, fruit mince pies, and wine. Modern Christmas hampers from commercial companies are packaged for postal delivery instead of being packed in wicker baskets.

=== Christmas hampers for serving troops ===
Christmas hampers packed with treats from home have traditionally been sent to serving troops overseas. In 1915, over 20,000 Christmas hampers were sent to Australian troops as they retreated from Gallipoli. The Christmas goodies were packed in billies printed with patriotic cartoons. The little gifts from home included practical items that would have been luxuries to serving troops such as tobacco or cigarettes, matches, razor blades, knitted socks, pencil & writing paper, as well as foodstuffs like cake, sauces, pickles, tinned fruit, cocoa, coffee and Anzac biscuits.

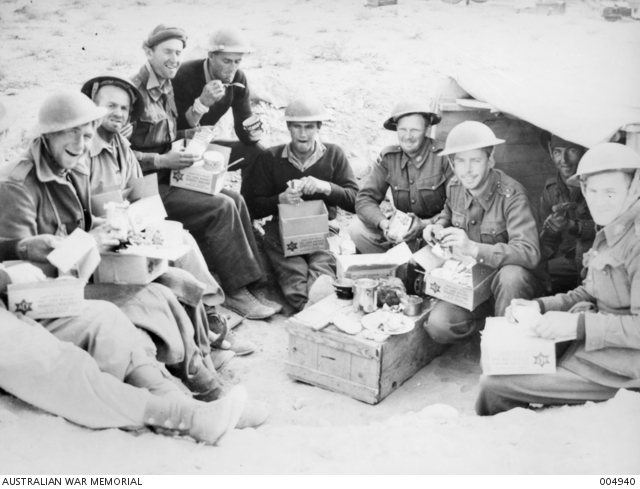
Christmas Hampers were delivered to Australian troops serving in Libya during the Second World War.

In 2010, Christmas hampers packed with treats including Vegemite and Cadbury chocolate, were flown in to Afghanistan, Iraq, East Timor and the Solomon Islands for Australian Defence Force troops deployed overseas.

== Commercial hampers ==
A number of companies sell ready-made food hampers or provide customised hampers, which may involve sourcing specific items. Such hampers are popular gift items in the UK and Ireland. Hamper companies usually link their services to certain occasions, most particularly Christmas. Grocers, delis and supermarkets may also stock ready-made hampers, though mostly just on a seasonal basis, and with a selection generally limited to items stocked by the store or sourced from their own suppliers.

Recently some dietary hamper companies have started catering specifically to customers with dietary requirements.

== See also ==
- W Gadsby & Son Ltd
- Wardrobe
