= Gatsby =

Gatsby may refer to:

- The Great Gatsby, a 1925 novel by F. Scott Fitzgerald
  - The Great Gatsby (disambiguation), an index of film adaptations of the novel
  - Jay Gatsby, the novel's central character

== Other uses ==
- Gatsby cap, a hat with a stiff front brim
- Gatsby (JavaScript framework), a static site generator based on React
- Gatsby (sandwich), a South African food
- GATSBY, a Japanese cosmetic brand under Mandom
- Gatsby Charitable Foundation, a grant-making trust in London
- Gatsbys American Dream, a progressive rock band from Seattle, Washington, United States
- Gatsby: An American Myth: a 2024 musical by Florence Welch and Thomas Bartlett

== See also ==
- Gadsby (disambiguation)
