= Matt Cavanagh =

British political adviser and author

Matt Cavanagh (born 1971) is a British political adviser and author. He was a special adviser in the UK Labour government (2003–10). He worked for Home Secretary David Blunkett; for Chancellor Gordon Brown; for Defence Secretary Des Browne; and for Brown as Prime Minister from June 2007 to May 2010. Subsequently, he was an associate director at the Institute for Public Policy Research, working on UK immigration policy. He now works in the private sector as Director of Government Relations for Prudential plc.

== Biography ==
Matthew Cavanagh was born in 1971. He was educated at Bedford Modern School and Balliol College, Oxford, where he read PPE, and then took a BPhil and DPhil in Philosophy. From 1996 to 2000 he was lecturer in Philosophy at St Catherine's College, Oxford. From 2000 to 2003 he was a strategy consultant for the Boston Consulting Group.

Cavanagh is the author of Against Equality of Opportunity a controversial work of 2002 that criticises conventional understandings of the doctrine of equality of opportunity. It gained positive reviews across the political spectrum, including in the Times Educational Supplement and in The Spectator. Other reviews were mixed, including Jeremy Waldron in the London Review of Books and in the Guardian.

Two years later in 2004, with Cavanagh now working as a special adviser, the Guardian returned to the book with a front-page story arguing that his views on race and equal opportunity made him unfit to work in government. This led to widespread calls for Cavanagh to be sacked, with questions tabled in Parliament, and the affair rumbled on for a few days. The Guardian letters page carried a balance of letters for and against Cavanagh.

In 2009 he was briefly in the news again, when he was accused of putting pressure on NHS statisticians to release statistics on knife crime prematurely. The UK Statistics Watchdog reprimanded Downing Street, and again there were calls for his sacking, including from the Public Administration Committee.

Cavanagh has written on Afghanistan and other subjects for Prospect and The Spectator magazines. He is a regular contributor to a number of blogs including the New Statesman, The Spectator, and Labour Uncut.

He was the British national champion at Rugby fives in 2004 and 2006, and has since been a veteran winner.
