= Ernie Gadsby =

English footballer

Personal information
- Full name: Ernest Gadsby
- Date of birth: 21 June 1884
- Place of birth: New Whittington, England
- Date of death: 1963 (aged 78–79)
- Place of death: Don Valley, England
- Position: Forward

Senior career*
| Years | Team | Apps | (Gls) |
| –1904 | New Whittington Exchange | | |
| 1904–1908 | Chesterfield | 15 | (2) |
| 1908 | Denaby United | | |
| 1908–1909 | Mexborough Town | | |
| 1909–1910 | Barnsley | 44 | (13) |
| 1910–1911 | Bristol City | 10 | (1) |
| 1910–1911 | Castleford Town | | |
| 1911–1913 | Reading | | |
| 1913–1914 | Worksop Town | | |
| 1914–1915 | Glossop | 32 | (5) |
| 1919–1920 | New Whittington Exchange | | |
| 1920–1921 | Clay Cross Town | | |
| 1921 | Clay Cross Zingari | | |
| 1921 | Bentley Colliery | | |
- * Club domestic league appearances and goals

Ernest Gadsby (21 June 1884 – 1963), sometimes known as Scan Gadsby, was an English professional footballer who played as a forward in the Football League for Barnsley, Glossop, Chesterfield and Bristol City.

== Personal life ==
Gadsby's brother Walter was also a footballer. In January 1918, 3 1/2 years after the outbreak of the First World War, Gadsby was called up to serve as a gunner in the Royal Field Artillery. He was posted to the Western Front in April 1918 and was gassed and suffered trench fever.

== Career statistics ==
Appearances and goals by club, season and competition
| Club | Season | League | | | FA Cup | | Total | |
| Club | Season | Division | Apps | Goals | Apps | Goals | Apps | Goals |
|---|---|---|---|---|---|---|---|---|
| Chesterfield | 1904–05 | Second Division | 3 | 0 | 0 | 0 | 3 | 0 |
| Chesterfield | 1905–06 | Second Division | 3 | 0 | 0 | 0 | 3 | 0 |
| Chesterfield | 1906–07 | Second Division | 7 | 2 | 0 | 0 | 7 | 2 |
| Chesterfield | 1907–08 | Second Division | 2 | 0 | 0 | 0 | 2 | 0 |
| Chesterfield | Total | | 15 | 2 | 0 | 0 | 15 | 2 |
| Glossop | 1914–15 | Second Division | 32 | 5 | 1 | 0 | 33 | 5 |
| Career total | | | 47 | 7 | 1 | 0 | 48 | 7 |
