= Theory and Research in Education =

- Discipline: Education
- Language: English
- Edited by: Randall Curren

Publication details
- History: 2003-present
- Publisher: SAGE Publications in association with The Slovene Society of Researchers in the School Field (United Kingdom)
- Frequency: Triannually

Standard abbreviations
- ISO 4: Theory Res. Educ.

Indexing
- ISSN: 1477-8785 (print); 1741-3192 (web)
- LCCN: 2003249118
- OCLC no.: 52120076

Links
- Journal homepage; Online access; Online archive

Theory and Research in Education is a triannual peer-reviewed academic journal that covers field of education. The editor-in-chief is Randall Curren (University of Rochester). It was established in 2003 and is published by SAGE Publications in association with The Slovene Society of Researchers in the School Field.

== Abstracting and indexing ==
The journal is abstracted and indexed International Bibliography of the Social Sciences, Scopus, and Sociological Abstracts.
