= Polarization (economics) =

Economists refer to the polarization of the labor force when middle-class jobs—requiring a moderate level of skills, like autoworkers’ jobs—seem to disappear relative to those at the bottom, requiring few skills, and those at the top, requiring greater skill levels. The structure of job opportunities in the United States has sharply polarized over the past two decades, with expanding job opportunities in both high-skill, high-wage occupations and low-skill, low wage occupations combined with contracting opportunities in middle-wage, middle-skill white-collar and blue-collar jobs. Although this has contributed to the rise of income inequality in the U.S. it is a minor factor compared to the relatively rapid rise in income and wealth by the top 1%. Employment and economic polarization is widespread across industrialized economies; it is not a uniquely American phenomenon. Over the past decades, wage gains were also polarized, with modest gains at the extremes and smaller gains in the middle. A good description of polarization in Great Britain is one of the first uses of the term, economic polarization.

== History ==
Although "polarization" is a relatively young concept in economic analysis, the phenomenon of wage and labor skill polarization is as old as economics. More recently economic polarization has been connected to both automation and the export of jobs to low wage countries. Many middle-skilled jobs are routine and demand only average skills and abilities. As a result, current computer technologies are able to handle them, or, alternatively, they can be outsourced electronically to foreign websites to be performed by comparatively low-wage workers.

== Causes ==
Because polarization appears similar in 16 European countries as well as the U.S. it seems likely that similar forces affect these shared economic developments. Loss of American manufacturing jobs to overseas global competitors has removed many middle skill jobs. Structural changes with more investment in robotics has removed other middle skill jobs globally, but not the lowest skill or the highest skill. As computers become more competent, this may change. Changes in education in the Third World, with increased education levels in the rest of the world compared to levels in industrial nations, has affected highly industrial economies. Unionization has mixed effects on polarization, since it tends to raise wages at all levels, but reduces the differences between managerial and other employees. The decline in unionization in America may increase polarization slightly. Globalization also lowers wages across the board.The most powerful causes are the redistributive effects of government, through laws such as those that discourage unionization, determine corporate governance, and limit the extent of monopoly rents. These laws generally are plutocratic and accrue benefit to those at the top, at the expense of those in the middle, driving many of the latter into the bottom. As an example of how polarization is affected by labor demand, rather than skill distributions, changing patterns of employment and earnings show strong correlations between wages and the proportion of a skill group employed. When fewer are employed, the wages go down rather than up as simple supply and demand would predict. Another factor is the levelling off of the supply of college graduates after the 1970s in the US and the consequent increase in the wage gap between college graduates and high school graduates. Whether this is also occurring in other industrial countries is not so clear.

== Consequences ==
One way of quantifying the polarization of the economy is to compare the fraction of those with incomes that are close to the middle—for example, a range that goes from 50 percent greater than the median to 50 percent less than the median—has fallen since 1970 from just over 50 percent to just over 42 percent. Similarly, the U.S. and the E.U. have shown almost identical trends in the share of employment rise by the high and low skill jobs, and a loss by the middle skill jobs, between 1993 and 2006. Polarization became an issue during the 2012 United States presidential election when Joe Biden asserted that the previous policies had "eviscerated" and "buried" the middle class. This picked up on Stiglitz' statement: "But in recent years, America’s middle class has become eviscerated,..."

Job polarization has also changed the nature of business cycle recoveries. Prior to polarization, employment would recover quickly following recessions because employment in routine jobs would bounce back. Since the 1980s, job polarization has led to the permanent loss of routine jobs, especially during recessions. Following the recessions of the 1990s and 2000s, employment would not recover because routine jobs are not coming back. This has led to jobless recoveries.
