= Walter Gadsby (footballer, born 1882) =

English footballer

Personal information
- Full name: Walter Gadsby
- Date of birth: 14 April 1882
- Place of birth: New Whittington, England
- Date of death: 28 November 1961 (aged 79)
- Place of death: Chesterfield, England
- Position: Full back

Senior career*
Years	Team	Apps	(Gls)
–1904	New Whittington Exchange		
1904–1908	Chesterfield	16	(0)
- Old Whittington Mutuals
- New Whittington Exchange
- * Club domestic league appearances and goals

Walter Gadsby (14 April 1882 – 28 November 1961) was an English professional footballer who played as a full back in the Football League for Chesterfield.

== Personal life ==
Gadsby's brother Ernie was also a footballer.

== Career statistics ==
Appearances and goals by club, season and competition
Club	Season	League			FA Cup		Total	
Club	Season	Division	Apps	Goals	Apps	Goals	Apps	Goals
Chesterfield	1904–05	Second Division	3	0	0	0	3	0
Chesterfield	1905–06	Second Division	7	0	0	0	7	0
Chesterfield	1906–07	Second Division	6	0	1	0	6	0
Career total			16	0	1	0	16	0
