= W Gadsby & Son Ltd =

- Company type: Limited company
- Industry: Wholesale, Baskets
- Founded: London, England 1864
- Founder: William Gadsby
- Headquarters: Bridgwater, United Kingdom
- Products: Wicker Baskets, Gift Packaging
- Website: www.gadsby.co.uk

W Gadsby & Son Ltd is an English manufacturer and importer of wicker baskets and gift packaging. The company was established in 1864. It is based in Bridgwater, Somerset.

== History ==
The company was founded by William Gadsby in Stratford, London, in the year 1864. The business sold wicker items from a shop in Gurney Road. During World War II the original shop was bombed, and the company chose to relocate to the Somerset Levels. This location was chosen due to the prevalence of willow growth in the area, a low lying wetland region.

During World War II the company was employed by the Ministry of Defence to produce airborne panniers, large wicker baskets that were filled with supplies and munitions and dropped to troops by plane. The company opened a new store in Somerset, near the village of Burrowbridge at the side of the A361 road. During the 1970s much passing trade was lost as a result of the creation of the new M5 Motorway.

In 1988 the company was the subject of a documentary by Transition Vision. Willow focused on the willow industry on the Somerset Levels, covering areas such as cultivation and basket making. Until the mid-1990s the business was predominantly a producer of large baskets for use as picnic hampers and employed around 25 weavers. Many of these hampers were used in new cars, such as those sold by Rolls-Royce.

== Flooding problems and a shift to importing ==
Due to the low nature of the Somerset Levels, with much of the area at or below sea level, the business was regularly damaged by winter flooding. When exposed to water the wicker products became mouldy and had to be discarded on a number of occasions. This resulted in the movement of the business to a new facility near Bridgwater in 2002.

A 1996 article in the UK Financial Times examined the history of the business, as well as the shift to imported goods at that time. It also covered the issue of flooding and its effects upon the business. By 1996, W Gadsby & Son were importing around 100,000 willow hampers each year, the majority of which were from Eastern Europe. The worst flood to affect the company came during the winter of 1995, when a large amount of stock was lost during flooding that covered the Somerset Levels. Although willow thrives under wet conditions, the stock became contaminated when exposed to flood water and could not be sold.

== The company today ==
Since 2002 the company has occupied a site adjacent to the M5 Motorway in Bridgwater. This facility serves as the main warehousing and logistical hub for the company. The company is now managed by Paul Gadsby, a 5th generation family member.

The business assists annually with the nearby North Petherton Carnival, offering parking for the charity event.

Due to increasing labour costs the majority of sales now consist of imported items, with one weaver still used to produce English-made samples and bespoke items. The customer base of W Gadsby & Son Ltd includes companies such as Harrods. Much of its recent and current product development is focused on retail display, as well as gift packaging products.
