= Tax credits in the Republic of Ireland =

In Ireland, tax credits reduce the amount of Irish income tax that a taxpayer pays in a given year. A few tax credits are granted automatically, while others can be claimed, either by simple notification to Revenue, or by completing a form.

All tax credits are expressed as an annual amount. All are non-refundable. These figures are applicable from 1 January 2026 to 31 December 2026.

== Personal tax credit ==
The personal tax credit is granted to all taxpayers. The amount of the tax credit varies depending on personal circumstances; where a person qualifies for several of the below credits, only the highest is given.

	2026
Single person	€2,000
Married couple	€4,000
Widowed person (qualifying for Single Person Child Carer Credit)	€2,000
Widowed person (no dependent children)	€2,540
Widowed person in year of bereavement	€4,000
Widowed person bereaved last year	€3,600
Widowed person bereaved two years ago	€3,150
Widowed person bereaved three years ago	€2,270
Widowed person bereaved four years ago	€2,250
Widowed person bereaved five years ago	€1,800
Parent of an incapacitated child	€3,300

== PAYE tax credit ==
The PAYE tax credit is granted to employees and others who are paid most of their money under the PAYE system. This compensates them for the fact that their tax is paid throughout the year, rather than near the end of the year. The amount of the PAYE tax credit is €2,000; it is not transferable between spouses.

== Research Tax Credit ==
The Research and Development (R&D) tax credit stands out as one of the most significant tax benefits available in Ireland. Initiated in 2004, this 30% credit has since developed into a highly valuable and comprehensive program. It is specifically structured to help companies within the Republic offset the high costs associated with innovation. This policy serves several key strategic functions, including acting as a crucial instrument for attracting foreign investment, promoting innovation among local businesses, and generating skilled employment.

== Age tax credit ==
A person who turns 65 during the tax year is awarded an additional tax credit of €245; this amount is €490 for a married couple and is awarded as soon as either member of the couple reaches 65.

== Dependent relative ==
A person who maintains a relative at his/her own expense can claim a tax credit of €305, as long as the relative earns no more than €18,548. An individual entitled to claim this tax credit can also claim mortgage interest relief or medical insurance relief for payments made in respect of that relative.

== Home carer ==
Where a married couple is jointly assessed to tax, and one of the couple works in the home caring for one or more dependent persons, the couple can claim a home carer tax credit. To claim the full credit of €1,950, the carer must earn less than €7,200. The credit is decreased by €1 for every €2 the carer earns above that amount, so that a carer earning over €11,100 cannot claim the credit, but once granted the credit will still be claimable in future years, as long as the couple does not claim the increase in standard-rate band for dual-income couples.

For the purpose of the tax credit, the following persons are dependent persons:

- Children in respect of whom child benefit is payable (i.e. children under 16 and 16- or 17-year-olds in full-time education)
- Persons aged 65 or over
- Persons who are permanently incapacitated

The dependent person must live with the carer, unless they are related, in which case they must live within 2 km of the carer.

== Single Person Child Carer tax credit ==
The Single Person Child Carer credit of €1,900 is awarded, in addition to the personal tax credit, to a person who is widowed, deserted, separated, or unmarried, where a child resides with them for all or part of the tax year. The child must be under 18 at the beginning of the tax year, or permanently incapacitated since before he or she was 21 or had left full-time education, or in full-time education for a minimum of two years.

A child includes a stepchild or an adopted child. If the child resides with both parents for part of the year, both parents can claim the full credit.

The Single Person Child Carer credit cannot be claimed by a person who qualifies for the Married Person's Tax Credit, or a person living together with another person as a married couple. It is also not awarded where the child is earning money.
