= Vehicle registration plates of the Republic of Ireland =

Ireland
- Current format 2013 registration with Waterford county code
- Country: Ireland
- Country code: IRL

Current series
- Size: 520mm x 110mm
- Material: Acrylic or Aluminium
- Serial format: 123-A-12345; 123-AB-12345
- Colour (front): White with black text
- Colour (rear): White with black text
- Introduced: 1 January 2013

Availability
- Issued by: Local Authority

History
- First issued: 1903

In Ireland, vehicle registration plates (commonly known as "number plates" or "registration plates") are the visual indications of motor vehicle registration which has been mandatory since 1903 to display on most motor vehicles used on public roads in Ireland. The alphanumeric marks (or "registration numbers", officially termed "identification marks") themselves are issued by the local authority in which a vehicle is first registered. A vehicle's number plate is determined when it is first registered, the county/city code is taken from the first owner's postal address. Registration remains fixed on one vehicle until it is de-registered (exported, destroyed, etc.), and cannot be transferred to other vehicles.

== Format ==
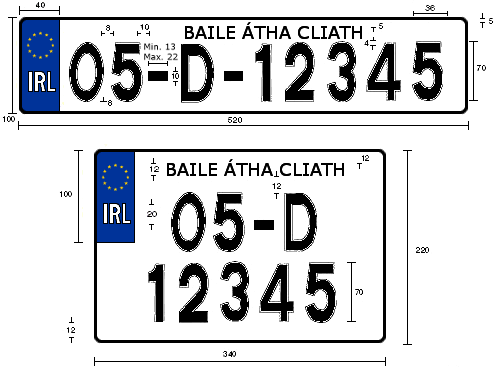
Illustration of Irish number plate specifications (1987–2012)

The current specification for number plates is the format YYH–CC–SSSSSS. Those issued from 1987 to 2012 had the format YY–CC–SSSSSS.

The components are:

- YY or YYH – a numeric year or half-year identifier based on date of the vehicle's first registration.
  - The former YY format used the last two digits of the year the car was registered.
  - The YYH format used since 2013 appends a 1 or 2 as a third digit depending on which half of the year the car was registered: 1 for January–June and 2 for July–December.
- CC – a one- or two-letter identifier of the area of the licensing authority, which registers vehicles on behalf of one or more local authorities. For example:
  - D is the identifier for County Dublin (four local authorities: Dublin City Council, Dún Laoghaire–Rathdown County Council, Fingal County Council, South Dublin County Council)
  - SO is the identifier for County Sligo (one local authority: Sligo County Council)
- SSSSSS – a one- to six-digit sequence number, starting with the first vehicle registered in the licensing authority area that year or half-year. For example, the 12,345th vehicle registered in Dublin in 1989 would display 89-D-12345; the 56,789th registered in Dublin in the first half of 2023 would display 231-D-56789.

== Specifications ==
Since July 2025, electric vehicle license plates may feature an optional green stripe

Since 1991, the design of the standard Irish number plate has been based on European standard guidelines, with a blue vertical band to the left of the plate containing the twelve stars of the Flag of Europe, below which is the country identifier for Ireland: IRL. The rest of the plate has a white background with black characters. There are usually two hyphens; between the year and county code, and between the county code and sequence number. Also required is the full Irish language name of the county/city which must be positioned above the identifier. From July 2025, new and existing vehicles emitting zero emissions at the tailpipe can optionally be registered with a green vertical band; rectangular plates have the green band printed to the right of the plate, while square plates feature the green band below the blue country identifier band.

The current regulations are set out in the Vehicle Registration and Taxation (Amendment) Regulations, 1999, as amended by the Vehicle Registration and Taxation (Amendment) Regulations 2012 and Vehicle Registration and Taxation (Amendment) Regulations 2025. These prescribe the format, dimensions and technical specifications of registration plates to be displayed on vehicles. They substitute the First Schedule of the Vehicle Registration and Taxation Regulations, 1992 to allow additional characters to be displayed on the registration plate and to ensure that these are displayed in the correct position and proportion. The changes were necessary to cater for increases in the number of car registrations.

A standard uniform character font is not required. The rules simply require legible black sans serif characters, no more than 70mm high and 36mm wide with a stroke width of 10mm, on a white reflective background. The result is that a large variety of perfectly legal font styles may be seen, on either pressed aluminium or acrylic plates, both of which are allowed. Commonly used fonts include a condensed version of Mandatory, Arial and FE-Schrift. Despite the rather relaxed lack of a specified font, the hyphen between the lettering must lie between the minimum dimensions of 13mm x 10mm or the maximum dimension of 22mm x 10mm.

If the plate's format does not meet the requirements, the vehicle will fail the mandatory periodic National Car Test (NCT), although some owners of custom plates evade this by switching to conformant plates temporarily for the NCT. As automatic number-plate recognition has become prevalent on toll roads and for traffic enforcement cameras, the use of hard-to-read nonstandard plates has become a concern. It is a criminal offence not to display plates in the specified format, liable to a fine after summary conviction of up to €5,000. In 2008, the Revenue Commissioners issued 69 formal warnings and launched no criminal prosecutions. The Road Traffic Act 2016 authorised the Garda Síochána (police) to issue a fixed-charge penalty instead of prosecution. The power was extended to the Revenue Commissioners in 2023. However, the statutory instrument setting the applicable penalty (of €60) was not made until 2024, and the Garda mobile app connecting to its PULSE IT system was not updated until October 2025.

== Current implementation ==
Example of Dublin number plate from 1999 (1987–2012)

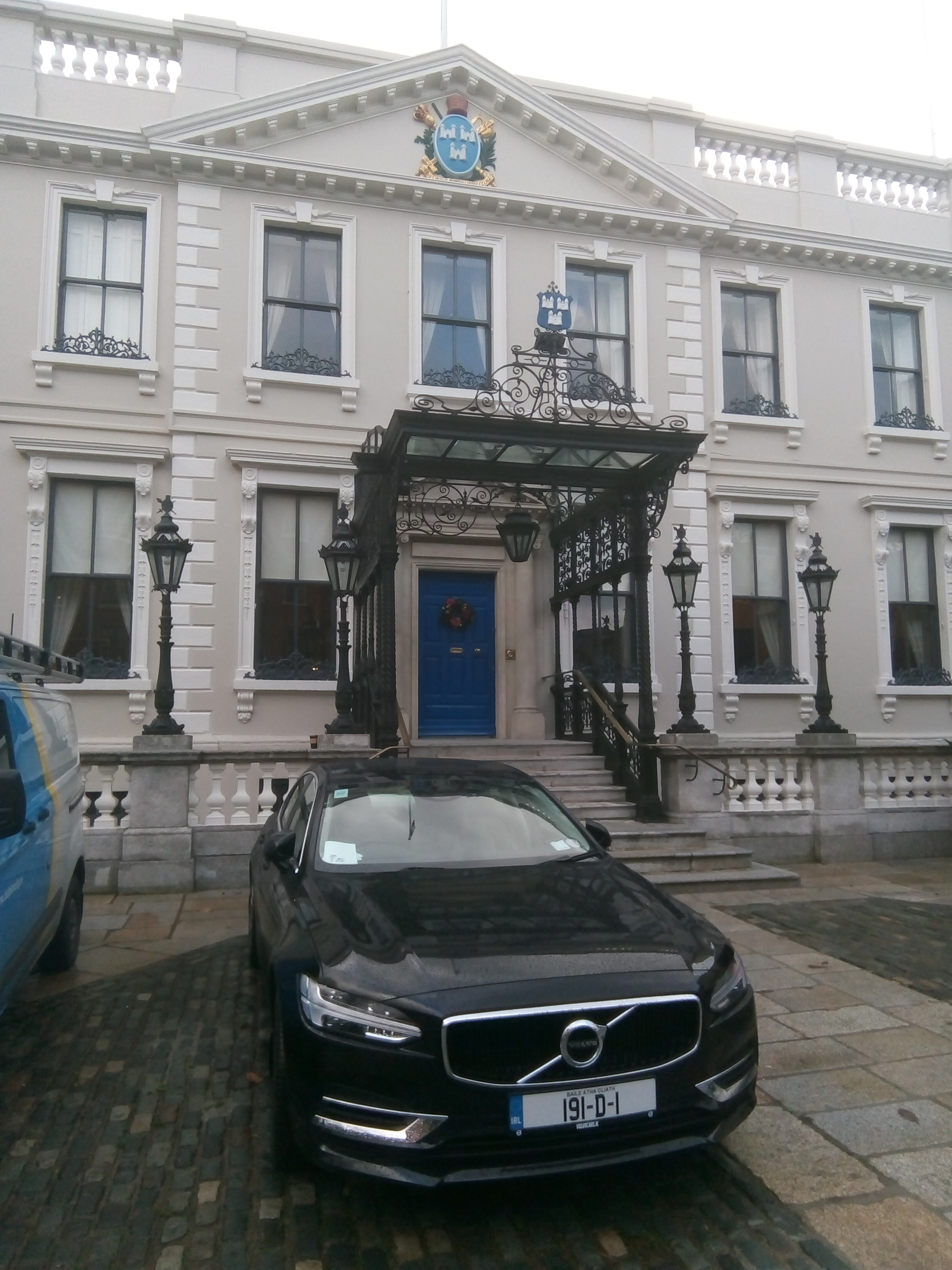
The Lord Mayor of Dublin's official car, with 191-D-1 plate, outside the Mansion House in 2019

Sequence numbers may be reserved for new vehicle registrations only on completion of form VRT15A and payment of €1,000. Reserved vehicle registrations have some limitations:

- This reservation was withdrawn from used imported vehicles on first Irish registration in 2015.
- Applications must be made on or after 1 November in the year before it is intended to first register the vehicle.
- The registration must be in the normal registration number format, meaning it must match the year, half year, county the vehicle will be registered in, and a sequence of digits. For example, 271-D-123456 is valid to be reserved for a Dublin resident intending to register a vehicle between January and July in 2027.
- The sequence number 1 of each year/half year is not available for reservation for vehicles registered in Cork, Dublin, Limerick, and Waterford. These are traditionally reserved for the respective mayor/lord mayor of these cities.

Notable examples of reserved registrations:

- In 2019, Lord Mayor Paul McAuliffe, the Lord Mayor of Dublin, was entitled to receive the registration plate 191-D-1 on his official vehicle.
- Luxury cars with numeric names are often registered with a matching, usually pre-reserved sequence number: for example 06-D-911 on a Porsche 911 or 06-D-750 BMW 750 or 03-C-5 for a 2003 Citroen C5 and 08-D-89 for an Aston Martin DB9.
- Dublin radio station FM104 tend to register their vehicles with reserved number sequences ending with "104", e.g. 05-D-38104.

There are only two pre-1987 codes still issued in Ireland.

- "ZZ", administered by the AA Ireland as agents for the Revenue Commissioners, is given to registrants who are based outside the state and who only intend keeping the vehicle within Ireland for a period not exceeding one month. This form of temporary registration is usually used for vehicles that are purchased within Ireland but exported by its new owner to another sovereign state directly after purchase. The format of the code is ZZ followed by a five digit number.
- "ZV", which can be selected as an alternative to the current scheme when registering a vehicle older than 30 years for the first time in Ireland.

== Special formats ==
Imported used cars are registered based on the year of first registration in their country of original registration rather than the year of import. Early in this system, each county used to have a continuous sequence of numbers for vehicles so if a new car registered on 31 December 2010 was 10 D 37456, then the next registered car from 2010 registered in 2011 would be 10 D 37457. This changed in late 2011 when each county (prior to 2010) had their next available sequence number increased. For example, 10-D-120006 would be the 6th import in Dublin of a car from 2010, as Dublin's re-registration band starts at 120000. Meath's starts at 15000.

Vehicles registered to the Irish Defence Forces have plates with silver letters on black background. These do not feature the Irish-language county name.

Trade plates have plates with white letters on a dark green background, but with the reverse style of the normal plates: the trader's number for that year is displayed first, the county second, and the applicable year last.

Starting from 1st July 2025, electrically powered vehicles may have a (Pantone 7481 c) green stripe on the right side in standard single-line plates; in the two-lines type the green band is placed on the lower half of the blue euroband on the left.

Diplomatic plates are very similar to civilian format, except for the small "CD" between the index mark code and serial number. Code CD is not always shown in Diplomatic plates.

== Index mark codes ==
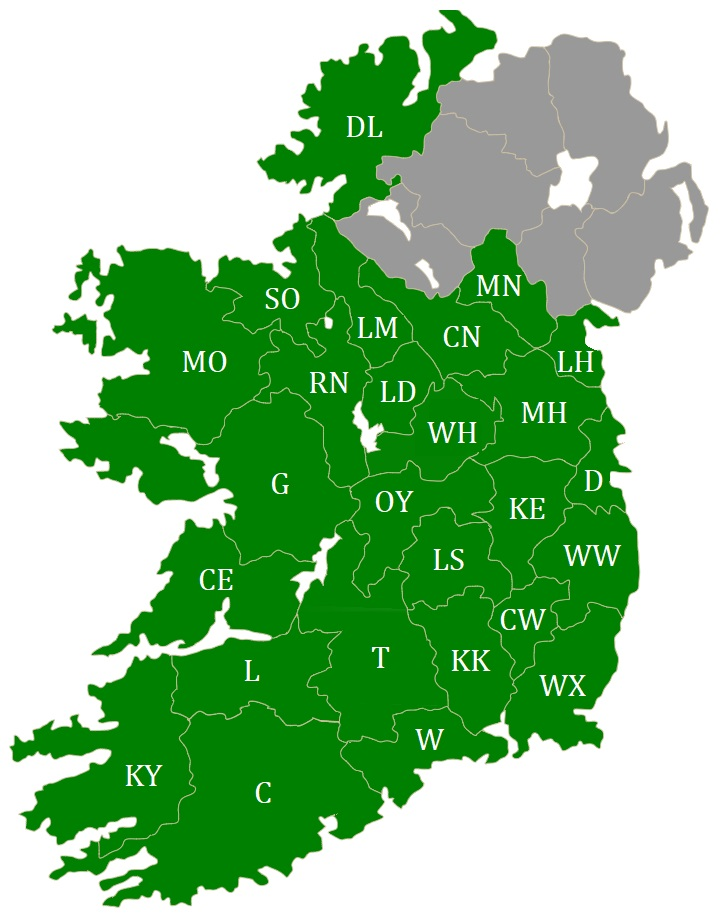
Map of Ireland showing the area codes used on vehicle registration plates

The city codes are a single letter, the initial letter of its English-language name. Most county codes use the first and last letters of the county's name. For example, Sligo is SO. The exceptions to this are:

- Where the county shares its registration function with the city of the same name, in which case both use the single-letter code. An example of this is County Cork, which shares the same name with Cork City, and takes the code "C".
- Where a conflict exists, i.e. Kerry is KY, so Kilkenny is KK; and County Waterford was (until 2014) WD, (subsequently changed to "W"), so Wexford is WX.
- The "T" code which is used in County Tipperary. This is because the county was, until 2014, divided into Tipperary North Riding (TN) and Tipperary South Riding (TS).

The codes are similar to the ISO 3166-2 codes for Irish counties. An exception is that the ISO code for Cork is IE-CO, since IE-C is used for the province of Connacht, and the ISO code for Tipperary is IE-TA (from the Irish name Tiobraid Árann).

=== Current index mark codes ===
Code	County	Irish name	Local authority
C	Cork	Corcaigh	Cork City Council; Cork County Council
CE	Clare	An Clár	Clare County Council
CN	Cavan	An Cabhán	Cavan County Council
CW	Carlow	Ceatharlach	Carlow County Council
D	Dublin	Baile Átha Cliath	Dublin City Council; Dún Laoghaire–Rathdown County Council; Fingal County Council; South Dublin County Council
DL	Donegal	Dún na nGall	Donegal County Council
G	Galway	Gaillimh	Galway City Council; Galway County Council
KE	Kildare	Cill Dara	Kildare County Council
KK	Kilkenny	Cill Chainnigh	Kilkenny County Council
KY	Kerry	Ciarraí	Kerry County Council
L	Limerick	Luimneach	Limerick City and County Council
LD	Longford	An Longfort	Longford County Council
LH	Louth	Lú/Lughbhaidh	Louth County Council
LM	Leitrim	Liatroim	Leitrim County Council
LS	Laois	Laois	Laois County Council
MH	Meath	An Mhí	Meath County Council
MN	Monaghan	Muineachán	Monaghan County Council
MO	Mayo	Maigh Eo	Mayo County Council
OY	Offaly	Uíbh Fhailí	Offaly County Council
RN	Roscommon	Ros Comáin	Roscommon County Council
SO	Sligo	Sligeach	Sligo County Council
T	Tipperary	Tiobraid Árann	Tipperary County Council
W	Waterford	Port Láirge	Waterford City and County Council
WH	Westmeath	An Iarmhí	Westmeath County Council
WX	Wexford	Loch Garman	Wexford County Council
WW	Wicklow	Cill Mhantáin	Wicklow County Council

Note: in the case of Counties Limerick, Tipperary, and Waterford, where a vehicle has been first brought into use in another country prior to 1 January 2014 and is subsequently imported into and registered in Ireland, the codes L, LK, TS, TN, W, and WD as formerly applicable continue to be issued for such vehicles. This is to maintain the integrity of the numbering system in place for the years prior to 2014.

=== Former index mark codes ===
Codes used from 1987 to 2013:

Code	Local authority
LK	Limerick County Council
TN	North Tipperary County Council
TS	South Tipperary County Council
WD	Waterford County Council

== EU standardised vehicle registration plates ==
Ireland was the first country to introduce the now common blue European Union strip (comprising the European flag symbol and the country code of the member state) on the left-hand side of the number plate in 1991, following the Road Vehicles (Registration and Licensing) (Amendment) Regulations statute of 1990 (S.I. No. 287/1990). A similar band was adopted by Portugal in 1992 and by Germany in 1994 and was standardised across the EU on 11 November 1998 by Council Regulation (EC) No 2411/98.

== History ==
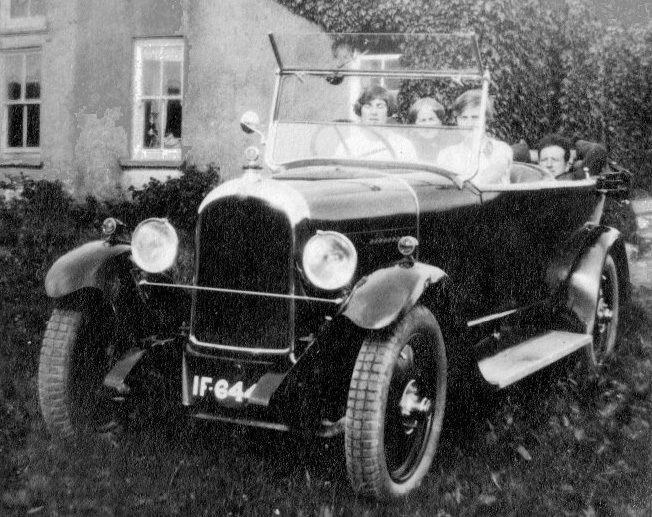
Early photograph of car with County Cork registration plate "IF 644"

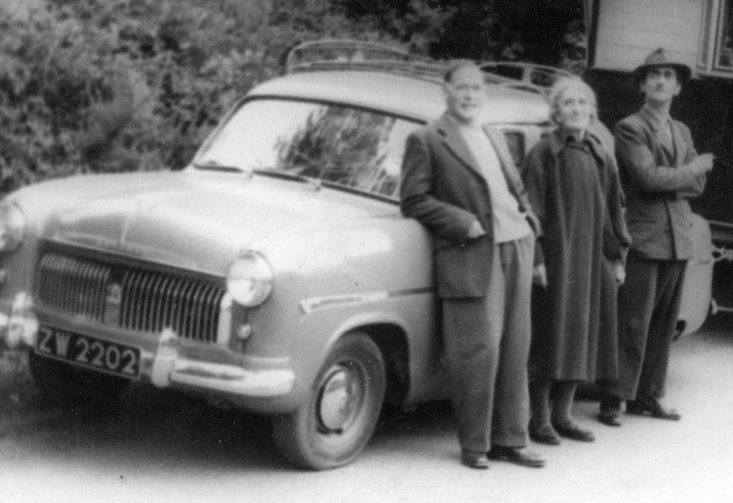
1951–1956 Ford Consul with County Kildare registration plate ZW 2202 – contemporary photograph

From 1903, the system used in Ireland was part of the original British system of identifiers. This was superseded in Ireland on 1 January 1987.

A two-letter code containing the letter I was allocated to each administrative county in alphabetical order (the full list appears below), with the initial registration format being the code followed by a sequence number from 1 to 9999, as in Great Britain. The codes allocated ran from IA to IZ, then from AI to WI, with the letters G, S, and V skipped as these were intended for Scotland. The full list was as follows:

Code	County
IA	Antrim
IB	Armagh
IC	Carlow
ID	Cavan
IE	Clare
IF	Cork
IH	Donegal
IJ	Down
IK	Dublin
IL	Fermanagh
IM	Galway
IN	Kerry
IO	Kildare
IP	Kilkenny
IR	Offaly (King's County)
IT	Leitrim
IU	Limerick
IW	Londonderry
IX	Longford
IY	Louth
IZ	Mayo
AI	Meath
BI	Monaghan
CI	Laois (Queen's County)
DI	Roscommon
EI	Sligo
FI	Tipperary North Riding
HI	Tipperary South Riding
JI	Tyrone
KI	Waterford
LI	Westmeath
MI	Wexford
NI	Wicklow

In 1921, shortly before the creation of the Irish Free State, Belfast and Dublin City completed their original marks and thus took the next available codes, XI and YI respectively, with Dublin City then taking ZI in 1927. After this, most other codes with Z as the first letter (again skipping those containing G, S and V) were allocated in alphabetical order, starting with single-letter Z – the only one-letter code used in Ireland – for County Dublin. (This does not include the ZZ code for temporary imports, introduced in 1925.)

In February 1952, a joint motor taxation authority was set up for Dublin City and county, and their codes were merged. Two years later, with all possible codes (at the time) allocated, a new format was introduced with a serial letter added before the code, and the sequence number running only to 999 (thus limiting the number of characters on a number plate to six). The Dublin joint authority was the first to adopt this format when it issued ARI 1 in May 1954, and each county followed suit once all its two-letter combinations had been issued. In the case of counties with more than one code, all the three-letter marks for the first allocated code would be issued, then all such marks for the second code, and so on (see the lists of series per county below).

G, S and V were not used as serial letters at first, while Z was not used before a code starting with that letter, so as to prevent any clashing with ZZ temporary registrations. Several other three-letter marks were not issued either through oversight or because they were deemed offensive, and the single-letter Z code was left out of this format as a serial letter would have created a duplicate of an existing two-letter code, particularly one used in Northern Ireland.

Initially, all number plates had been black with white or silver characters, but in 1969 the option of black-on-white at the front and black-on-red at the rear was introduced.

Graphic example of pre-1987 Irish registration plate with a typical font for Dublin County

In February 1970, the Dublin joint authority exhausted all its three-letter combinations and thus began issuing "reversed" registrations, starting with the original two-letter codes (plus single-letter Z) in order of allocation. These were followed from July 1974 onwards by the three-letter marks (1 ARI etc.), issued in the same manner as for the forward versions. Again, other counties followed this example over time. Also in 1974, Cork followed Dublin's example of setting up a joint motor taxation authority for city and county, though their codes were not merged until August 1985.

In 1982, with Dublin and several other counties having exhausted all possible combinations of their original codes, it was decided to allocate the skipped codes containing G, S and V to these counties. In the cases of these codes, the forward three-letter combinations were issued first in the same manner as before, followed by the forward two-letter combinations.

Under this system, Irish vehicle registration marks could be transferred to Britain for re-registration on other vehicles, even after Irish independence, and even though they could not be re-used within Ireland. The letter I in many combinations made these attractive for collectors, and indeed the Kilkenny issue VIP 1 fetched a record price at auction. Since the introduction of the current system in 1987, such exports have been impossible, even for old-format registrations, although those already exported may still be re-transferred.

In the 1980s, it became apparent that all possible combinations under the numbering system then in force would soon become exhausted. In Northern Ireland, this problem was rectified by the addition of additional digits. In the Republic of Ireland, it was decided to introduce an entirely new system with the format of double digits indicating the year of first registration, followed by one or two letters indicating the county of first registration, followed by a number, assigned to vehicles registered in a particular county in order (for example, 87-RN-9999 indicates that the vehicle was the 9999th to be registered in Roscommon in 1987). The new system was introduced on 1 January 1987.

The 1987 system allocated single-letter codes to the county boroughs (including those shared with counties) and two-letter codes to the other counties. Normally these are the initial and final letter of the English-language name of the county (except where duplicates would result). The full list was as follows:

Code	Local Authority
CW	Carlow
CN	Cavan
CE	Clare
C	Cork
DL	Donegal
D	Dublin
G	Galway
KY	Kerry
KD	Kildare
KK	Kilkenny
LS	Laois
LM	Leitrim
L	Limerick (City)
LK	Limerick (County)
LH	Louth
MO	Mayo
MH	Meath
MN	Monaghan
OY	Offaly
RN	Roscommon
SO	Sligo
TN	Tipperary North Riding
TS	Tipperary South Riding
W	Waterford (City)
WD	Waterford (County)
WH	Westmeath
WX	Wexford
WW	Wicklow

Until 1991, all plates under this system consisted solely of black characters on white, on both front and rear. However, in that year, the blue EU identifier and the official Irish language name of the county were added, the latter as a result of the controversy arising from using English as the basis, described by Conradh na Gaeilge, an organisation which promotes the Irish language in Ireland and worldwide, as "a fiasco".

Vehicles first registered outside the state before 1987 are allowed to be re-registered using only the current system, with a year number preceding 87 – for instance, a vehicle from 1964 re-registered in Meath would have 64-MH at the start of its registration.

In 2013, the year was changed to a 3-digit year with the third digit being 1 for January to June and 2 for July to December, for example, 131 for January–June 2013 and 132 for July–December 2013. The decision to change the year was based partly on superstition about an unlucky '13' registration, but also to boost sales in the second half of the year.

== Pre-1987 mark codes ==
The first codes were allocated in 1903, when all of Ireland was still part of the United Kingdom. The codes were based on the alphabetical order of counties and county boroughs (cities) as they were named at the time. King's County and Queen's County were renamed Offaly and Laois respectively following the independence of most of Ireland as the Irish Free State. Counties and county boroughs in italics are in Northern Ireland and still use the 1903 system.

Codes with the letters G, S and V were reserved until the 1980s when they were taken by counties that had exhausted all the combinations for their original codes.

letter	code (Ix)	County or city	code(xI)	County or city	code (Zx)	County or city
A	IA	Antrim	AI	Meath	ZA	Dublin City
B	IB	Armagh	BI	Monaghan	ZB	Cork County
C	IC	Carlow	CI	Queen's County (later Laoighis, Leix, Laois)	ZC	Dublin City
D	ID	Cavan	DI	Roscommon	ZD	Dublin City
E	IE	Clare	EI	Sligo	ZE	Dublin County
F	IF	Cork County	FI	Tipperary North Riding	ZF	Cork City
H	IH	Donegal	HI	Tipperary South Riding	ZH	Dublin City
J	IJ	Down	JI	Tyrone	ZJ	Dublin City
K	IK	Dublin County	KI	Waterford County	ZK	Cork County
L	IL	Fermanagh	LI	Westmeath	ZL	Dublin City
M	IM	Galway	MI	Wexford	ZM	Galway County
N	IN	Kerry	NI	Wicklow	ZN	Meath
O	IO	Kildare	OI	Belfast City	ZO	Dublin City and County
P	IP	Kilkenny	PI	Cork City	ZP	Donegal
R	IR	King's County (later Offaly)	RI	Dublin City	ZR	Wexford
T	IT	Leitrim	TI	Limerick City	ZT	Cork County
U	IU	Limerick County	UI	Derry City	ZU	Dublin City and County
W	IW	County Londonderry	WI	Waterford City	ZW	Kildare
X	IX	Longford	XI	Belfast City	ZX	Kerry
Y	IY	Louth	YI	Dublin City	ZY	Louth
Z	IZ	Mayo	ZI	Dublin City	ZZ	Temporary registrations
					Z	Dublin County
G	IG	Fermanagh (from 2004)	GI	Tipperary South Riding (from 1985)	ZG	Dublin City and County (from 1983)
S	IS	Mayo (from 1983)	SI	Dublin City and County (from 1982)	ZS	Dublin City and County (from 1984)
V	IV	Limerick (from 1982)	VI	British Virgin Islands (1995–1996) Derry City (2023 onwards)	ZV	Dublin City and County (from 1985) / vehicles >30 years old

=== Series per county 1903–1986 ===
Carlow CC: IC

IC 1 to IC 9999 (Note: A duplicate series of IC for cars and motorcycles existed prior to 1921.) (Dec 1903 – Apr 1964).
AIC 1 to YIC 994 (Apr 1964 – Dec 1986).

Cavan CC: ID

ID 1 to ID 9999 (Jan 1904 – Jul 1958).
AID 1 to ZID 999 (Jul 1958 – Dec 1976).
1 ID to 9999 ID (Dec 1976 – Feb 1981).
1 AID to 906 IID (Feb 1981 – Dec 1986).

Clare CC IE

IE 1 to IE 9999 (Note: A duplicate series of IE for cars and motorcycles existed prior to 1921.) (Jan 1904 – Mar 1959).
AIE 1 to ZIE 999 (Mar 1959 – Nov 1974).
1 IE to 9999 IE (Nov 1974 – Sep 1978).
1 AIE to 107 XIE (Sep 1978 – Dec 1986).

Cork CC: (in original issuing sequence) IF ZB ZK ZT

IF 1 to IF 9999 (Dec 1903 – Apr 1935);
ZB 1 to ZB 9999 (Apr 1935 – Apr 1949);
ZK 1 to ZK 9999 (Apr 1949 – May 1953);
ZT 1 to ZT 9999 (May 1953 – Dec 1955).

AIF 1 to ZIF 999 (Dec 1955 – Apr 1962);
AZB 1 to YZB 999 (Apr 1962 – Aug 1966);
AZK 1 to YZK 999 (Aug 1966 – Aug 1970);
AZT 1 to YZT 999 (Aug 1970 – Nov 1973).

1 IF to 9999 IF (Nov 1973 – May 1975);
1 ZB to 9999 ZB (May 1975 – Jul 1976);
1 ZK to 9999 ZK (Jul 1976 – Aug 1977);
1 ZT to 9999 ZT (Aug 1977 – Jun 1978).

1 AIF to 999 ZIF (Jun 1978 – Sep 1980);
1 AZB to 999 YZB (Sep 1980 – Jun 1983);
1 AZK to 999 PZK (Jun 1983 – Aug 1985);
1 RZK to 999 YZK (Aug 1985 – May 1986).

In June 1974 Cork County Council and Cork County Borough Council set up a joint motor taxation authority, administered by the County Council. However, separate registers continued in use for the County and the County Borough until the expiry of reverse ZPI in August 1985. See below for the sequences issued covering both areas. Marks in italics are after the merger.

Cork City: (in original issuing sequence) PI ZF

PI 1 to PI 9999 (Dec 1903 – Aug 1946);
ZF 1 to ZF 9999 (Aug 1946 – Dec 1958).

API 1 to ZPI 999 (Dec 1958 – Feb 1970);
AZF 1 to YZF 999 (Feb 1970 – Mar 1976).

1 PI to 9999 PI (Mar 1976 – Jun 1978);
1 ZF to 9999 ZF (Jun 1978 – Feb 1980).

1 API to 999 ZPI (Feb 1980 – Aug 1985).

In June 1974 Cork County Council and Cork County Borough Council set up a joint motor taxation authority, administered by the County Council. However, separate registers continued in use for the County and the County Borough until the expiry of reverse ZPI in August 1985. See below for the sequences issued covering both areas.

Cork County and County Borough Joint Office: (in issuing sequence) reverse 3-letter sequences of (R)ZK ZF

1 RZK to 999 YZK (Aug 1985 – May 1986);
1 AZF to 542 FZF (May 1986 – Dec 1986).

Donegal CC: (in original issuing sequence) IH ZP

IH 1 to IH 9999^{3} (Dec 1903 – Jan 1952);
ZP 1 to ZP 9999 (Jan 1952 – Nov 1961).

AIH 1 to ZIH 999 (Nov 1961 – Apr 1976);
AZP 1 to ZZP 407^{4} (Apr 1976 – Feb 1982).

408 IH to 9999 IH (Feb 1982 – Apr 1985);
1 ZP to 4853 ZP (Apr 1985 – Dec 1986).

^{3} A duplicate series of IH for cars and motorcycles existed prior to 1921.

^{4} ZZP was not authorised by SR&O (Statutory Rules & Orders) and was issued in error – no retrospective SR&O was issued to legitimise its issue. When the error was discovered ZZP was terminated at 407; in consequence the next series (reverse IH) commenced at 408.

Dublin CC (until 1952): (in original issuing sequence) IK Z ZE

IK 1 to IK 9999^{5} (Dec 1903 – Mar 1927);
Z 1 to Z 9999 (Mar 1927 – Sep 1938);
ZE 1 to ZE 9999 (Sep 1938 – Feb 1952).

^{5} A duplicate series of IK for cars and motorcycles existed prior to 1921.

In February 1952 Dublin County Council and Dublin County Borough Council set up a joint motor taxation authority. The joint office was administered by Dublin County Borough Council. See below for subsequent issues.

Dublin City (until 1952): (in original issuing sequence) RI YI ZI ZA ZC ZD ZH ZJ ZL

RI 1 to RI 9999^{6} (Dec 1903 – Apr 1921);
YI 1 to YI 9999 (Apr 1921 – Mar 1927);
ZI 1 to ZI 9999 (Mar 1927 – May 1933);
ZA 1 to ZA 9999 (May 1933 – Mar 1937);
ZC 1 to ZC 9999 (Mar 1937 – Jan 1940);
ZD 1 to ZD 9999 (Jan 1940 – Jan 1947);
ZH 1 to ZH 9999 (Jan 1947 – Jan 1949);
ZJ 1 to ZJ 9999 (Jan 1949 – Jul 1950);
ZL 1 to ZL 9999 (Jul 1950 – Feb 1952).

^{6} A duplicate series up to RI 3000 for cars and motorcycles existed prior to 1921.

In February 1952 Dublin County Council and Dublin County Borough Council set up a joint motor taxation authority. The joint office was administered by Dublin County Borough Council. See below for subsequent issues.

Dublin County and County Borough Joint Office (from February 1952): (in original issuing sequence) forward 2-letter sequences of ZO ZU; then forward 3-letter combinations of RI IK YI ZA ZC ZD ZE ZH ZI ZJ ZL ZO ZU; then reverse 2-letter sequences of RI IK YI Z ZA ZC ZD ZE ZH ZI ZJ ZL ZO ZU; then reverse 3-letter combinations of RI IK YI ZA ZC ZD ZE ZH ZI ZJ ZL ZO ZU; then forward 3-letter combinations of SI ZG ZS ZV; then forward 2-letter sequences of SI ZG ZS ZV.

ZO 1 to ZO 9999 (Feb 1952 – May 1953);
ZU 1 to ZU 9999 (May 1953 – May 1954).

ARI 1 to YRI 999^{7} (May 1954 – Sep 1955);
AIK 1 to ZIK 999^{8} (Sep 1955 – Nov 1957);
AYI 1 to YYI 999^{9} (Nov 1957 – Oct 1959);
AZA 1 to YZA 999 (Oct 1959 – Jan 1961);
AZC 1 to YZC 999 (Jan 1961 – Apr 1962);
AZD 1 to YZD 999 (Apr 1962 – May 1963);
AZE 1 to YZE 999 (May 1963 – Jun 1964);
AZH 1 to YZH 999 (Jun 1964 – May 1965);
AZI 1 to YZI 999 (May 1965 – Jun 1966);
AZJ 1 to YZJ 999 (Jun 1966 – Jun 1967);
AZL 1 to YZL 999 (Jun 1967 – May 1968);
AZO 1 to YZO 999 (May 1968 – Mar 1969);
AZU 1 to YZU 999 (Mar 1969 – Feb 1970).

1 RI to 9999 RI (Feb – May 1970);
1 IK to 9999 IK (May – Sep 1970);
1 YI to 9999 YI (Sep 1970 – Feb 1971);
1 Z to 9999 Z (Feb – Jun 1971);
1 ZA to 9999 ZA (Jun – Oct 1971);
1 ZC to 9999 ZC (Oct 1971 – Mar 1972);
1 ZD to 9999 ZD (Mar – Jun 1972);
1 ZE to 9999 ZE (Jun – Oct 1972);
1 ZH to 9999 ZH (Oct 1972 – Feb 1973);
1 ZI to 9999 ZI (Feb – May 1973);
1 ZJ to 9999 ZJ (May – Aug 1973);
1 ZL to 9999 ZL (Aug – Dec 1973);
1 ZO to 9999 ZO (Dec 1973 – Apr 1974);
1 ZU to 9999 ZU (Apr – Jul 1974).

1 ARI to 999 YRI^{7} (Jul 1974 – May 1975);
1 AIK to 999 ZIK^{8} (May 1975 – Mar 1976);
1 AYI to 999 YYI^{9} (Mar 1976 – Jan 1977);
1 AZA to 999 YZA (Jan – Aug 1977);
1 AZC to 999 YZC (Aug 1977 – Mar 1978);
1 AZD to 999 YZD (Mar – Sep 1978);
1 AZE to 999 YZE (Sep 1978 – Apr 1979);
1 AZH to 999 YZH (Apr – Oct 1979);
1 AZI to 999 YZI (Oct 1979 – Apr 1980);
1 AZJ to 999 YZJ (Apr 1980 – Jan 1981);
1 AZL to 999 YZL (Jan – May 1981);
1 AZO to 999 YZO (May 1981 – Jan 1982);
1 AZU to 999 YZU (Jan – Aug 1982).

ASI 1 to ZSI 999 (Aug 1982 – Jun 1983);
AZG 1 to YZG 999 (Jun 1983 – May 1984);
AZS 1 to YZS 999 (May 1984 – Mar 1985);
AZV 1 to YZV 999 (Mar 1985 – Jan 1986).

SI 1 to SI 9999 (Jan – Apr 1986);
ZG 1 to ZG 9999 (Apr – Jul 1986);
ZS 1 to ZS 8709 (Jul – Dec 1986);
ZV 1^{10} and up (1989? – present).

^{7} GRI, IRI, SRI, VRI and ZRI (both original and reverse format) were not issued.

^{8} GIK, SIK and VIK (both original and reverse format) were not issued.

^{9} ZIK (both original and reverse format) were not issued.

^{10} Forward 2-letter sequences of ZV were issued as an alternative to the current scheme for vehicles older than 30-years for the first time in Ireland, and also issued countrywide.

International circulations (from April 1925): ZZ

ZZ 1 to ZZ 9999 (Apr 1925 – Mar 1983);
1 ZZ to 9999 ZZ (Mar 1983 – Mar 1989);
ZZ 10000^{11} and up (circa Mar 1989 – present).

^{11} Some reserved number blocks issued out of sequence within main block.

Galway CC: (in original issuing sequence) IM ZM

IM 1 to IM 9999 (Jan 1904 – Oct 1950);
ZM 1 to ZM 9999 (Oct 1950 – Nov 1959).

AIM 1 to ZIM 999 (Nov 1959 – May 1970);
AZM 1 to YZM 999 (May 1970 – Aug 1976).

1 IM to 9999 IM (Aug 1976 – Apr 1978);
1 ZM to 9999 ZM (Apr 1978 – Oct 1979).

1 AIM to 999 ZIM (Oct 1979 – Feb 1985);
1 AZM to 797 GZM (Feb 1985 – Dec 1986).

Galway city became a separate local authority area from Galway county on 4 April 1985, but the two councils remained a single licensing authority.

Kerry CC: (in original issuing sequence) IN ZX

IN 1 to IN 9999 (Dec 1903 – Jan 1954);
ZX 1 to ZX 9999 (Jan 1954 – Jan 1962).

AIN 1 to ZIN 999 (Jan 1962 – Jan 1973);
AZX 1 to YZX 999 (Jan 1973 – Jun 1979).

1 IN to 9999 IN (Jun 1979 – Jan 1982);
1 ZX to 9999 ZX (Jan 1982 – Jan 1986).

1 AIN to 375 CIN (Jan – Dec 1986).

Kildare CC: (in original issuing sequence) IO ZW

IO 1 to IO 9999 (Dec 1903 – Jun 1953);
ZW 1 to ZW 9999 (Jun 1953 – Apr 1963).

AIO 1 to ZIO 999^{12} (Apr 1963 – Mar 1976);
AZW 1 to YZW 999 (Mar 1976 – May 1983).

1 ZW to 9343 ZW (May 1983 – Dec 1986).

^{12} IIO and OIO were not issued.

Kilkenny CC: IP

IP 1 to IP 9999 (Jan 1904 – Feb 1955);
AIP 1 to ZIP 999^{13} (Feb 1955 – Jul 1974).

1 IP to 9999 IP (Jul 1974 – Oct 1978);
1 AIP to 235 UIP^{13} (Oct 1978 – Dec 1986).

^{13} GIP, KIP were not issued in original format, RIP were not issued in reverse format.

VIP1 issued in 1971 was later transferred to the UK licensing system where it is currently issued.

Laoighis CC ( renamed Laoighis (alternative spellings Laois and Leix) in June 1922): CI

CI 1 to CI 9999 (Dec 1903 – Jul 1960).
ACI 1 to ZCI 999 (Jul 1960 – Apr 1981).
1 CI to 7342 CI (Apr 1981 – Dec 1986).

Leitrim CC: IT

IT 1 to IT 9999^{14} (Dec 1903 – May 1972).
AIT 1 to KIT 780 (May 1972 – Dec 1986).

^{14} A duplicate series of IT for cars and motorcycles existed prior to 1921.

Limerick CC: IU IV

IU 1 to IU 9999 (Dec 1903 – Nov 1954).
AIU 1 to ZIU 999^{15} (Nov 1954 – Sep 1971).
1 IU to 9999 IU (Sep 1971 – May 1975).
1 AIU to 999 ZIU^{15} (May 1975 – Feb 1982)(note reverse GIU not issued).

AIV 1 to OIV 520^{16} (Feb 1982 – Dec 1986).

^{15} GIU (both original and reverse format) were not issued; JIU 111 issued early in December 1961 – main JIU sequence commenced April 1962.

^{16} IIV and MIV were not issued.

Limerick City: TI

TI 1 to TI 9999 (Jan 1904 – Oct 1959).
ATI 1 to ZTI 999 (Oct 1959 – Mar 1977).
1 TI to 9999 TI (Mar 1977 – Jan 1982).
1 ATI to 929 FTI (Jan 1982 – Dec 1986).

Longford CC: IX

IX 1 to IX 9999 (Dec 1903 – Feb 1970).
AIX 1 to PIX 710 (Feb 1970 – Dec 1986).

Louth CC: (in original issuing sequence) IY ZY

IY 1 to IY 9999 (Dec 1903 – Oct 1954);
ZY 1 to ZY 9999 (Oct 1954 – Jan 1964).

AIY 1 to ZIY 999 (Jan 1964 – Oct 1976);
AZY 1 to YZY 999 (Oct 1976 – Sep 1985).

101 ZY to 2507 ZY (Sep 1985 – Dec 1986).

Mayo CC: IZ IS

IZ 1 to IZ 9999 (Jan 1904 – Oct 1954).
AIZ 1 to ZIZ 999^{17} (Oct 1954 – May 1971).
1 IZ to 9999 IZ (May 1971 – Feb 1976).
1 AIZ to 999 ZIZ^{17} (Feb 1976 – Apr 1983).

AIS 1 to HIS 990 (Apr 1983 – Dec 1986).

^{17} GIZ (both original and reversed format) were not issued.

Meath CC: (in original issuing sequence) AI ZN

AI 1 to AI 9999 (Dec 1903 – Sep 1951);
ZN 1 to ZN 9999 (Sep 1951 – Feb 1962).

AAI 1 to ZAI 999 (Feb 1962 – Jun 1975);
AZN 1 to YZN 999 (Jun 1975 – Oct 1982).

1 AI to 9999 AI (Oct 1982 – Dec 1986);
10 ZN to 88 ZN (Dec 1986).

Monaghan CC: BI

BI 1 to BI 9999 (Dec 1903 – Mar 1961).
ABI 1 to ZBI 999 (Mar 1961 – Oct 1981).
1 BI to 6540 BI (Oct 1981 – Dec 1986).

Offaly CC (County Council of Kings County, renamed Offaly in June 1922): IR

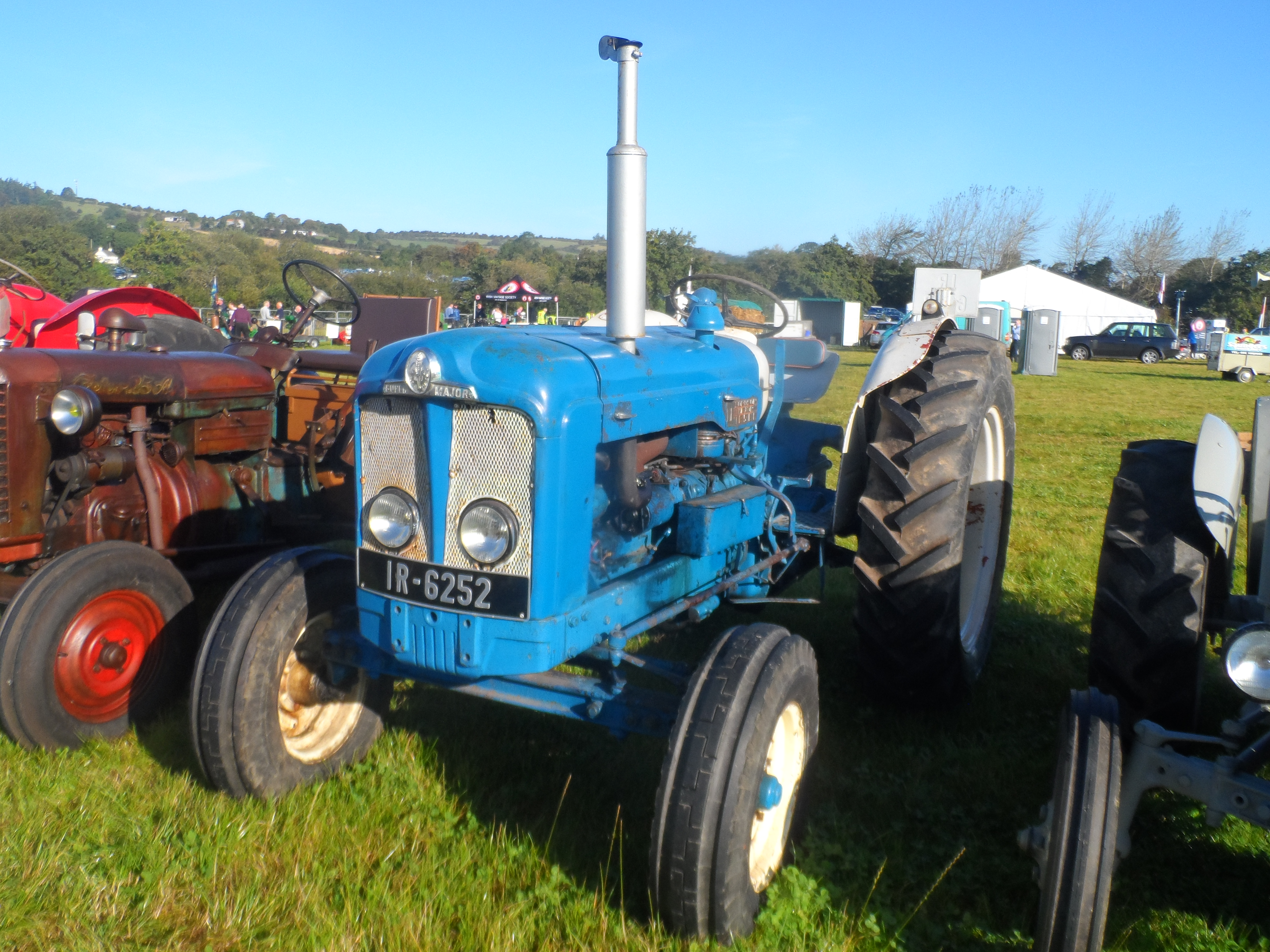
Tractor with an IR licence plate

IR 1 to IR 9999 (Jan 1904 – May 1960).
AIR 1 to ZIR 999 (May 1960 – Mar 1981).
1 IR to 7834 IR (Mar 1981 – Dec 1986).

Roscommon CC: DI

DI 1 to DI 9999^{18} (Dec 1903 – Jan 1963).
ADI 1 to ZDI 999 (Jan 1963 – Apr 1980).
1 DI to 9999 DI (Apr 1980 – Feb 1986).
100 ADI to 292 BDI (Feb – Dec 1986).

^{18} A duplicate series of DI for cars and motorcycles existed prior to 1921.

Sligo CC: EI

EI 1 to EI 9999 (Dec 1903 – Nov 1959).
AEI 1 to ZEI 999 (Nov 1959 – Feb 1980).
1 EI to 9999 EI (Feb 1980 – Apr 1986).
1 AEI to 835 AEI (Apr – Dec 1986).

Tipperary North Riding CC: FI

FI 1 to FI 9999^{19} (Dec 1903 – Jan 1958).
AFI 1 to ZFI 999^{20} (Jan 1958 – May 1977).

1 FI to 9999 FI (May 1977 – Jan 1981).
1 AFI to 418 JFI (Jan 1981 – Dec 1986).

^{19} FI 1-50 issued for cars only; then duplicate series for cars and motorcycles from FI 51 up, until 1920.
^{20} The series with the prefix JFI never issued although the series with the suffix JFI was issued. ZFI was not authorised by SR&O (Statutory Rules & Orders) No.128, issued 18 May 1967 and was issued in error, commencing Dec 1976. SR&O No.128 only authorised the blocks KFI–PFI and RFI–YFI. No retrospective SR&O was issued to legitimise ZFI's issue.

Tipperary South Riding CC: HI GI

HI 1 to HI 9999^{21} (Dec 1903 – Sep 1954).
AHI 1 to ZHI 999 (Sep 1954 – Nov 1971).
1 HI to 9999 HI^{21} (Nov 1971 – May 1976).
1 AHI to 999 ZHI (May 1976 – May 1985).

AGI 1 to CGI 871 (May 1985 – Dec 1986).

^{21} GHI and IHI (both original and reversed format) were not issued.

Waterford CC: KI

KI 1 to KI 9999 (Jan 1904 – Mar 1961).
AKI 1 to ZKI 999 (Mar 1961 – Jul 1979).
1 KI to 9999 KI (Jul 1979 – Jun 1986).
1 AKI to 586 AKI (Jun – Dec 1986).

Waterford City: WI

WI 1 to WI 9999 (Jan 1904 – Jan 1966).
AWI 1 to WWI 80 (Jan 1966 – Dec 1986).

Westmeath CC: LI

LI 1 to LI 9999 (Dec 1903 – Jun 1959).
ALI 1 to ZLI 999 (Jun 1959 – Aug 1978).
1 LI to 9999 LI (Aug 1978 – Feb 1983).
1 ALI to 869 GLI (Feb 1983 – Dec 1986).

Wexford CC: (in original issuing sequence) MI ZR

MI 1 to MI 9999^{22} (Jan 1904 – Jun 1952);
ZR 1 to ZR 9999 (Jun 1952 – May 1961).

AMI 1 to YMI 999^{23} (May 1961 – Jul 1973);
AZR 1 to YZR 999 (Jul 1973 – Jun 1980).

1 MI to 9999 MI (Jun 1980 – Oct 1983);
1 ZR to 8071 ZR (Oct 1983 – Dec 1986).

^{22} MI 9922-9999 were issued by the Police in 1921 as a consequence of The Road Vehicles (Defaulting Councils)(Ireland) Order, 1921.

^{23} ZMI were not issued.

Wicklow CC: NI

NI 1 to NI 9999 (Jan 1904 – May 1957).
ANI 1 to ZNI 999^{24} (May 1957 – May 1975).
1 NI to 9999 NI (May 1975 – Mar 1979).
1 ANI to 426 TNI (Mar 1979 – Dec 1986).

^{24} QNI was issued in Northern Ireland for cars with indeterminate age, kit cars.

On 1 January 1987, a completely new registration plate system was introduced for new vehicles.

Vehicles older than 1987 imported into Ireland from 1987 were not given age-related numbers from the old system but were included in the new system. Their initial year number and county (i.e. A UK reg 1967 Ford Cortina (MHW 7E) would be registered as 67-D-1 (e.g. 67-D (or any county initial) 1) This would state the year of its first registration or manufacture outside the state but since 2011 these numbers have begun at 120000 which is not historical or authentic (e.g. 67-D-120001). A 1986 Opel with right-hand-drive registered in Ireland would have a pre-1987 style registration plate, the same model car with left-hand-drive imported from the rest of Europe or a Vauxhall from England, Scotland or Wales would have new 86 registration plate. Volkswagen Beetle cars that were imported as knock-down kits from Mexico and assembled up to the mid-2000s were registered in Ireland on original Irish reg chassis having pre-1987 number plates. Pre-1987 registration plates are few and far between nowadays and are mostly found at vintage car shows.

== See also ==
- Motor Tax in the Republic of Ireland
- Vehicle registration plates of the United Kingdom
- Vehicle registration plate
- List of international license plate codes
- Vienna Convention on Road Traffic
