= Motor tax in the Republic of Ireland =

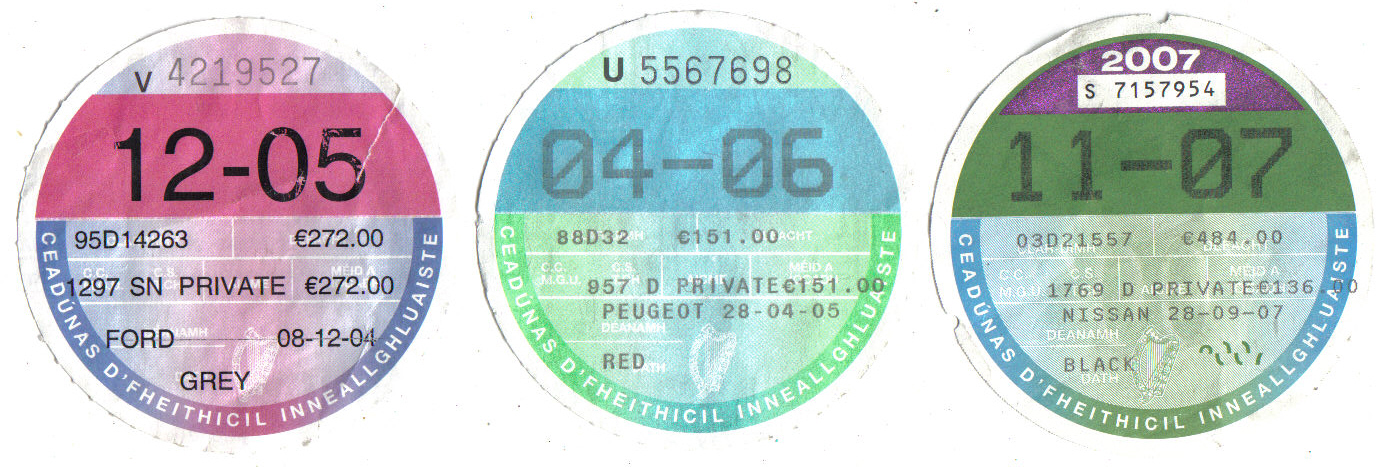
Motor tax discs for various private vehicles, 2005 to 2007. One of these is required by law to be displayed on a vehicle to show current tax has been paid. The large printed numbers indicate the date of expiry (Month-Year).

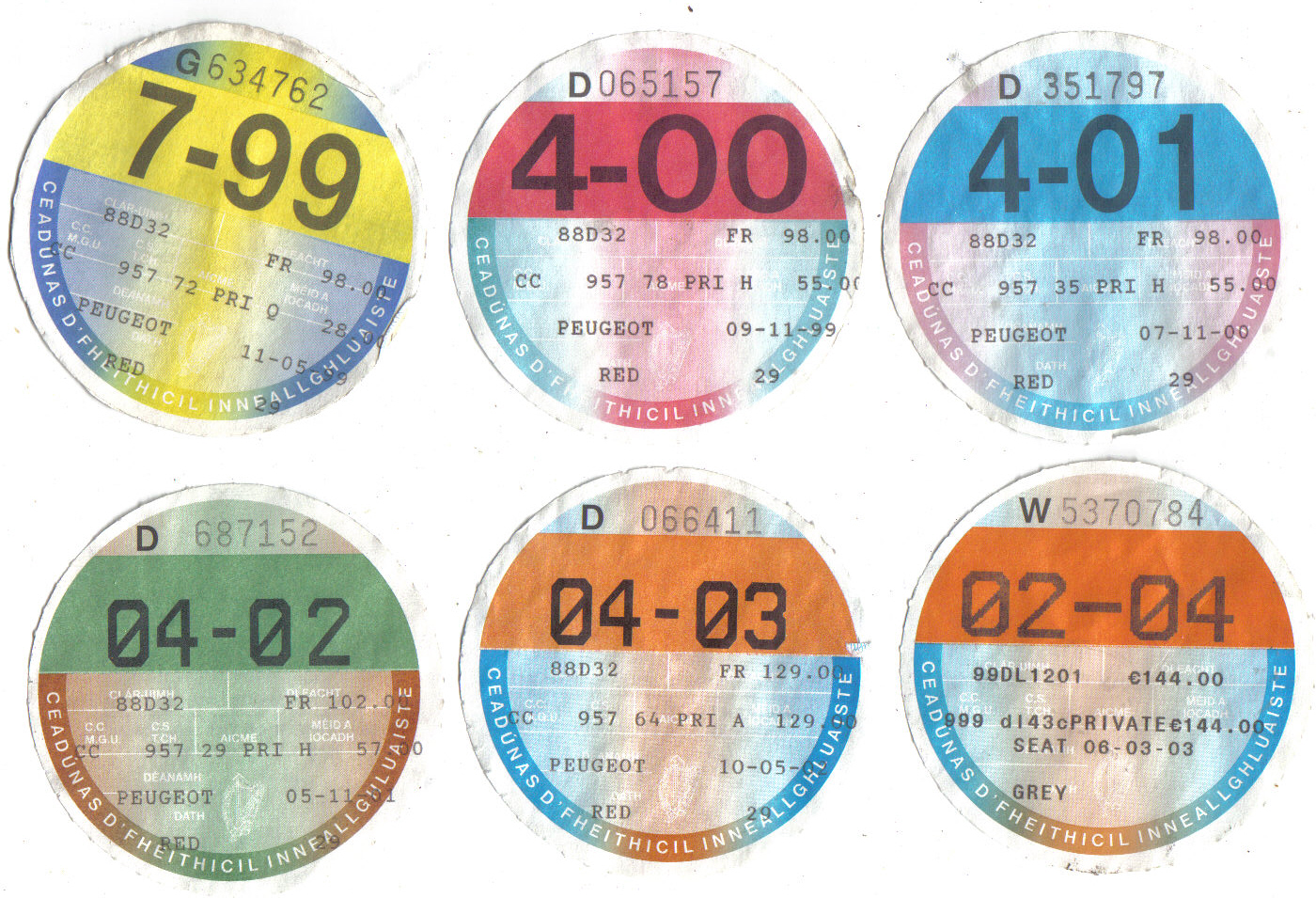
Motor tax discs, 1999 to 2004

Motor Tax (Irish: Cáin Mhótair) is an annual duty payable on motor vehicles (subject to exemptions) in Ireland for use in public places. A new system for new private cars was introduced on July 1, 2008, where the tax rates are based on the carbon dioxide emissions of the car while in operation. Prior to this, tax rates are assessed on engine displacement; this includes used imports first registered in their original country of sale before July 2008. Motorcycles are all taxed the same regardless of engine displacement, with a special rate for electrically powered cycles. For goods vehicles, commercial vehicles, and public service vehicles, it is based on weight or is a standardised fee. For taxation of cars with Wankel engines under the old size-based system, the actual engine displacement is multiplied by 1.5, so for example, a Mazda RX-8 with a 1.3-litre rotary engine is taxed as a 1.8-litre engined vehicle.

Motor tax can be purchased for a duration of three, six, or twelve months for some classes of vehicles. Valid vehicle insurance is required to pay for motor tax. Once tax is paid, the vehicle owner receives a motor tax disc, which is required by law to be displayed on the vehicle (usually on the front windscreen where available, along with insurance and NCT discs where required). Failure to display a tax disc can result in a fine, and failure to pay for motor tax can result in further fines or prosecution.

Motor tax can be refunded if the car has not been in use in public places under certain circumstances, for example, if the vehicle has been scrapped, permanently exported from the country, stolen and not recovered, or the owner has been unable to use the vehicle for certain reasons.

== Rates ==
As of 2014, annual motor tax rates for private cars on the emissions-based system range from €120 (0 g/km CO_{2}) to €2,350 (more than 225 g/km). Tax for motorcycles varies from €35 to €88.

Vehicles 30 years old or more qualify for "vintage" motor tax status - a special low rate of €26 per year for motorcycles or €56 per year for all other vehicles.

Motor tax can be paid in annual, half-year and quarterly instalments. The tax can be paid online or in person at Motor Tax Offices.

== Exemptions ==
There are a number of exempt vehicles:

- State-owned vehicles (these still carry tax discs with a rate of €0.00 printed on them), for example Garda vehicles and CIÉ buses.
- Diplomatic vehicles.
- Vehicles are exempted under the Disabled Drivers and Disabled Passengers (Tax Concessions) Regulations, 1994 (S.I. No. 353 of 1994).
- Vehicles (including any cycle with an attachment for propelling it by mechanical power) not exceeding 400 kilogrammes in weight, unladen, and used for invalids (see invalid carriage.
- Vehicles which are used exclusively for the transport (whether by carriage or traction) of lifeboats and their gear or any equipment for affording assistance towards the preservation of life and property in cases of shipwreck and distress at sea
- Vehicles, which are used exclusively for mountain and cave rescue purposes.
- Vehicles, which are used exclusively for underwater search and recovery purposes.
- Vehicles which are used exclusively for the transport (whether by carriage or traction) of road construction machinery that is built in as part of such vehicle or otherwise permanently attached thereto carry no load except articles or materials used for the purpose of the road construction machinery and are used for no purpose other than the construction or repair of roads.
- refuse carts, sweeping machines, or watering machines used exclusively for cleansing public streets and roads.
- Ambulances, road rollers, or fire engines.
- Vehicles kept by a local authority and used exclusively for the purpose of their fire brigade service.

== See also ==
- Taxation in the Republic of Ireland
