= Taxation in the Republic of Ireland =

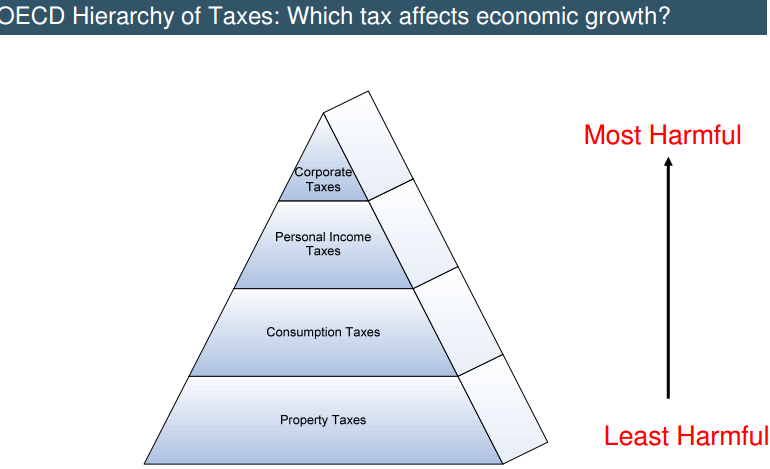
Recreation of the OECD Hierarchy of Taxes, which is central to Irish tax policy

Taxation in Ireland in 2017 came from personal income taxes (40% of Exchequer Tax Revenues, or ETR), and consumption taxes, being VAT (27% of ETR) and excise and customs duties (12% of ETR). Corporation taxes (16% of ETR) represents most of the balance (to 95% of ETR), but Ireland's Corporate Tax System (CT) is a central part of Ireland's economic model. Ireland summarises its taxation policy using the OECD's Hierarchy of Taxes pyramid (see graphic), which emphasises high corporate tax rates as the most harmful types of taxes where economic growth is the objective. The balance of Ireland's taxes are Property taxes (<3% of ETR, being Stamp duty and LPT) and Capital taxes (<3% of ETR, being CGT and CAT).

An issue in comparing the Irish tax system to other economies is adjusting for the artificial inflation of Irish GDP by the base erosion and profit shifting (BEPS) tools of U.S. multinationals in Ireland. In 2017, the Central Bank of Ireland replaced Irish GDP with Irish GNI* to remove the distortion; 2017 GDP was 162% of 2017 GNI* (EU–28 2017 GDP was 100% of GNI). Properly adjusted, Ireland's Total Gross Tax (Note: Most OECD Taxation Statistics use Gross Tax Revenues, which are effectively Exchequer Tax Revenues (ETR) with Social Security Contributions (also called PRSI in Ireland), and other Appropriations-in-Aid ("A–in–A") items added in. As 2017 Irish PRSI is circa 20% of ETR, the differences are material. However, Irish Social Security Contributions are still generally lower than those of the EU and OECD averages.)-to-GNI* ratio of 36% is in-line with the EU–28 average (36%), and above the OECD average (33%); Ireland's Exchequer Tax-to-GNI* ratio of 28%, is in line with the EU–28 average (28%), and the OECD average (27%). Within these aggregate taxation metrics, the most distinctive differences between Ireland's taxation system and those of the average EU–28 and OECD taxation systems, are lower net Irish Social Security Contributions (i.e. PRSI less child benefits), offset by higher Irish Corporation tax receipts.

Within Ireland's taxation system, the most distinctive element is the ratio of net Personal Income taxes on higher earners versus lower earners, which is called progressivity. In 2016, the OECD ranked Irish personal taxation as the 2nd most progressive tax system in the OECD, with the top 10% of earners paying 60% of taxes. The 2018 OECD Taxing Wages study showed Irish average single and average married wage-earners (Note: For both, the Irish average wage was €36,358 per annum; the average married wage-earner was the sole earner in a family with another spouse and two children) paid some of the lowest effective employment tax rates in the OECD, with Irish average married wage-earners paying an employee tax rate of 1.2%.

In 2018, the Irish Revenue Commissioners disclosed that 80% of 2017 Irish corporate tax was paid by foreign multinationals, and the top 10 multinationals paid 40% of Irish Corporation tax in 2017. Ireland's Corporate tax system is controversial and has drawn labels of Ireland as a tax haven. In June 2017, Ireland's CT system was ranked as one of the world's largest Conduit offshore financial centers (OFCs) (i.e. places that act as links to tax havens), in March 2018 the Financial Stability Forum ranked Ireland as the 3rd largest Shadow Banking OFC, and in June 2018 tax academics calculated that Ireland was the world's largest corporate tax haven.

Ireland's Property taxes (Stamp duty and LPT) are in line with the EU and OECD averages, but unlike Irish Income taxes, are not overtly progressive.

== Structure of Irish tax revenues ==
=== Distribution of Exchequer Tax Revenues ===
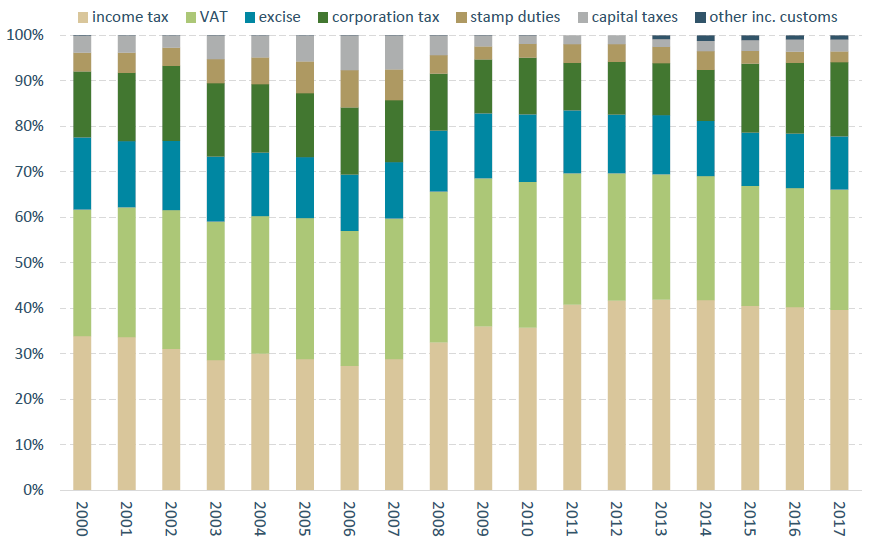
Distribution of Irish Exchequer Tax Revenues

Each year, the Department of Finance is required to produce a report on Estimates for Receipts and Expenditure for the coming year. The table below, is extracted from the "Tax Revenues" section of the report for the prior-year (e.g. the 2017 column is from the 2018 report), by which time the "Tax Revenues" for that year are largely known (although still subject to further revision in later years).

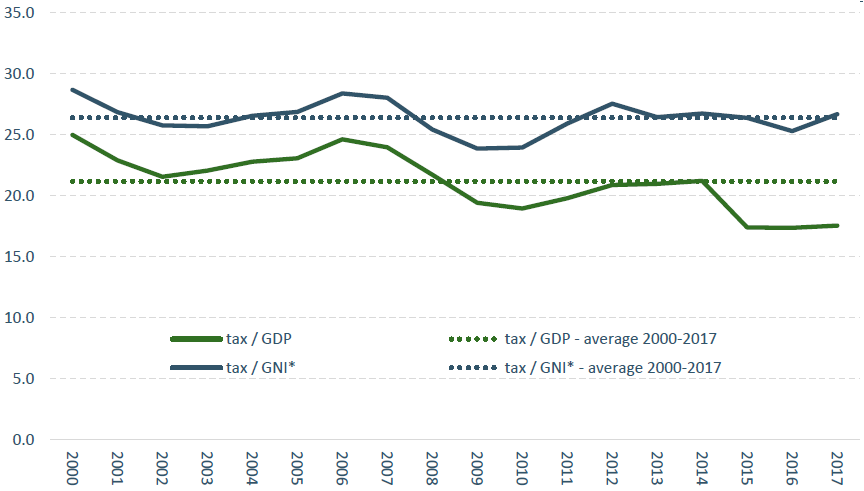
Irish Exchequer Tax Revenues as % of GDP / GNI*

The "Tax Revenues" quoted are Exchequer Tax Revenues, and do not include Appropriations-in-Aid ("A–in–A") items, the largest being Social Security (or PRSI) which for 2015 was €10.2 billion, and other smaller items. Irish Personal Income tax, and the two main Irish consumption taxes of VAT and Excise, have consistently been circa 80% of the total Irish Exchequer Tax Revenue, with the balance being Corporate tax.

Irish Exchequer Tax Revenues (Department of Finance Estimates):
Category	Amount (€ m)				Distribution (%)			
Category	2014	2015	2016	2017	2014	2015	2016	2017
Customs	260	355	330	335	1%	1%	1%	1%
Excise Duty	5,080	5,245	5,645	5,735	12%	12%	12%	11%
Capital Gains Tax (CGT)	400	555	695	795	1%	1%	1%	2%
Capital Acquisitions Tax (CAT)	330	370	455	450	1%	1%	1%	1%
Stamp Duties	1,675	1,320	1,220	1,200	4%	3%	3%	2%
Income Tax (PAYE)	17,181	18,199	19,184	20,245	42%	41%	40%	40%
Corporation Tax (CT)	4,525	6,130	7,515	7,965	11%	14%	16%	16%
Value-Added Tax (VAT)	11,070	12,025	12,630	13,425	27%	27%	26%	27%
Local Property Tax (LPT)	520	438	460	470	1%	1%	1%	1%
Total Exchequer Tax Revenue	41,041	44,637	48,134	50,620	100%	100%	100%	100%

=== International comparisons ===
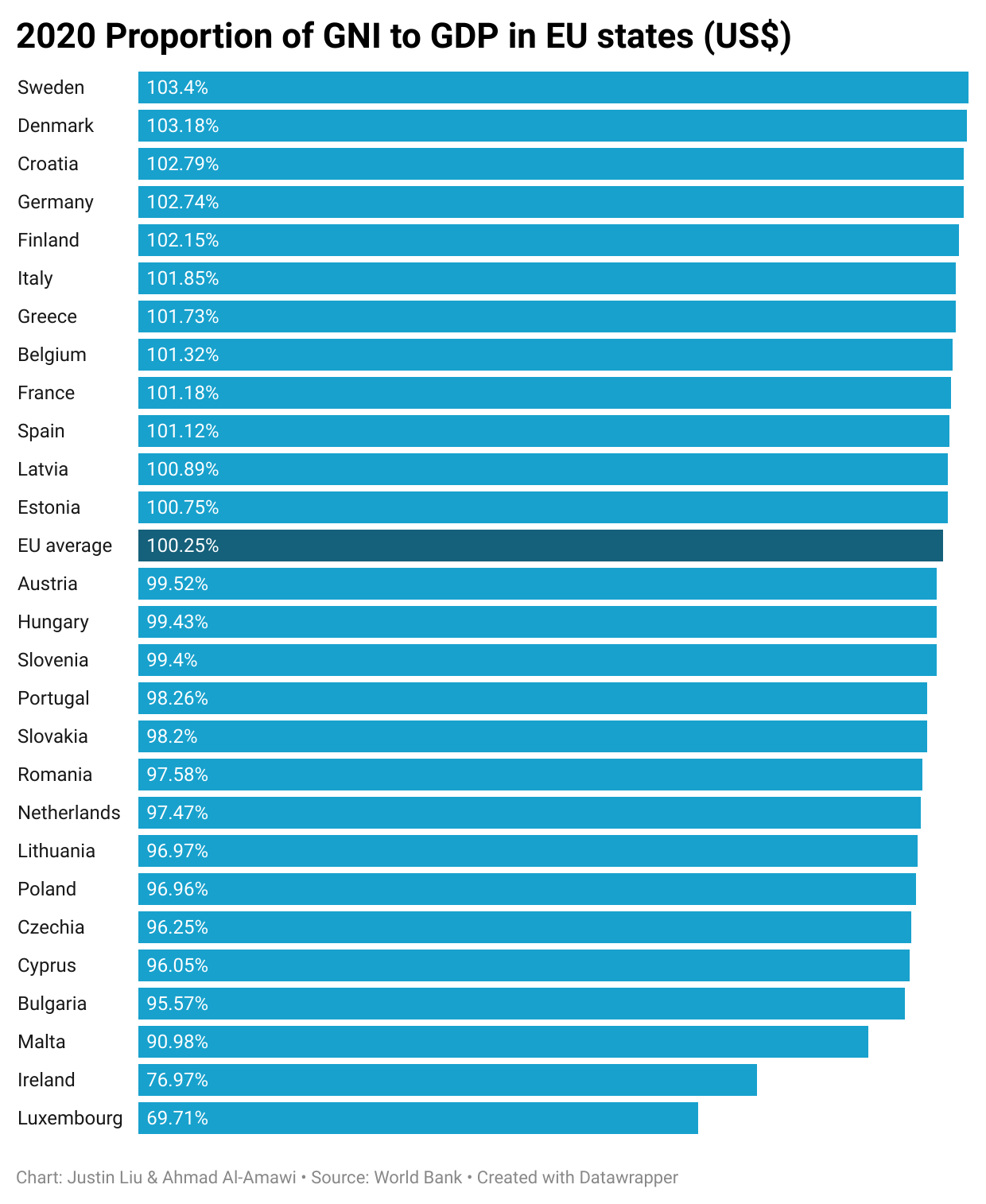
Ireland has one of the most disparate GNI to GDP ratios in the EU.

Comparisons of Ireland's tax system and international tax systems are complicated by two issues:

- Distortion of Ireland's GDP. Ireland's GDP is artificially inflated by the BEPS flows of Ireland's Multinational tax schemes. In 2018, Eurostat found 25% of Ireland's 2010-14 GDP was BEPS flows (no taxable impact). In Q1 2015, Apple restructured its Irish BEPS tools, which required Irish 2015 GDP to be restated by 34.4%. In February 2017, the Central Bank of Ireland replaced Irish GDP with a new metric, GNI*, to remove the distortion; 2017 GDP was 162% of 2017 GNI* (EU–28 2017 GDP was 100% of GNI).
- Effect of deductions and provisions. While Ireland's headline rates of taxation can be compared internationally, the effect of various tax deductions and provisions can materially change the net effective rate of taxation in a given area. The most dramatic, and controversial example of this is the difference between Ireland's headline corporate tax rate of 12.5%, and its effective corporate tax rate of under 4% (see below). However, this issue also appears in VAT and in the effect of child benefit transfers on tax wedge estimates of the net tax on take-home pay.

Key sources for comparison are the OECD Tax Database and the OECD Ireland Tax Bulletins. The Department of Finance has a Tax Policy Group which up until 2014, published documents that compared Ireland's taxation system internationally, including the main tax policy differences with other OECD countries.

==== Total Gross Tax-to-GDP ratio ====
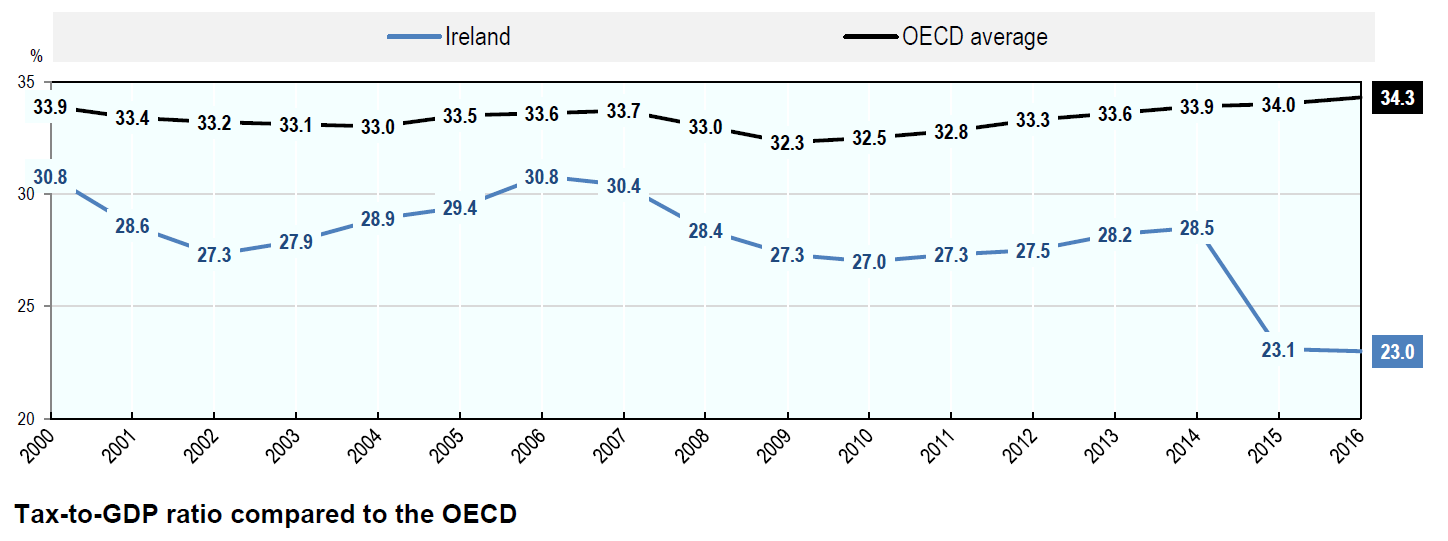
OECD Gross Tax-to-GDP ratio (2000–2016)

From 2000 to 2014, Ireland's Total Gross Tax-to-GDP ratio was 27–30%, versus the OECD average of 33%, and EU–27 average of 36%. In October 2013, the Department of Finance Tax Policy Group, highlighted the distortion of Irish GDP impacted this metric, and Ireland's Tax-to-GNP ratio at 36% was above the OECD average, and in line with the EU–27 average.

However, since Apple's 2015 restructuring, Ireland's headline Tax-to-GDP ratio had fallen to the bottom of the OECD range at under 23%. Using 2017 GNI* (Irish 2017 GDP is 162% of Irish 2017 GNI*), Ireland Tax-to-GNI* ratio is back to 33%, in line with the OECD average. In 2017, Eurostat noted that Irish GNI* still contained BEPS tool distortions, and thus the Irish Tax-to-GNI* ratio is understated.

==== Income tax (PAYE and PRSI) ====
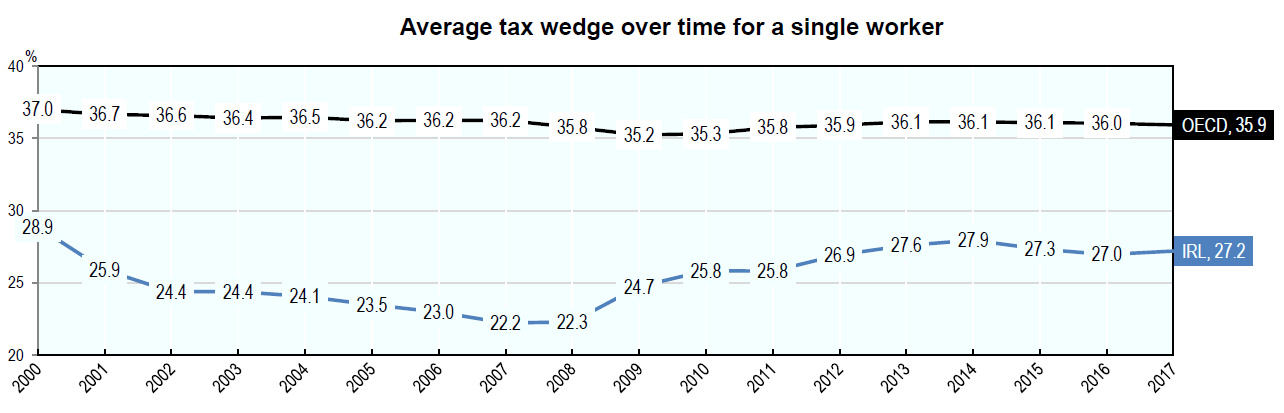
Tax wedge for a single worker: OECD versus Ireland.

The OECD's 2018 Taxing Wages shows Ireland's tax wedge for labour income, which is the total tax (PAYE and EE and ER–PRSI less SS Benefits) paid on Irish wages by both the employee and employer, as a % of the total cost of labour to the employer (PAYE and ER–PRSI), is one of the lowest in the OECD. Of the 35 OECD members in 2017, the average Irish single-worker cost 27.2% in taxes versus the OECD average of 35.9% (ranked 29th–lowest), and the average Irish married worker cost 10.8% in taxes versus the OECD average of 26.1% (ranked 31st–lowest).

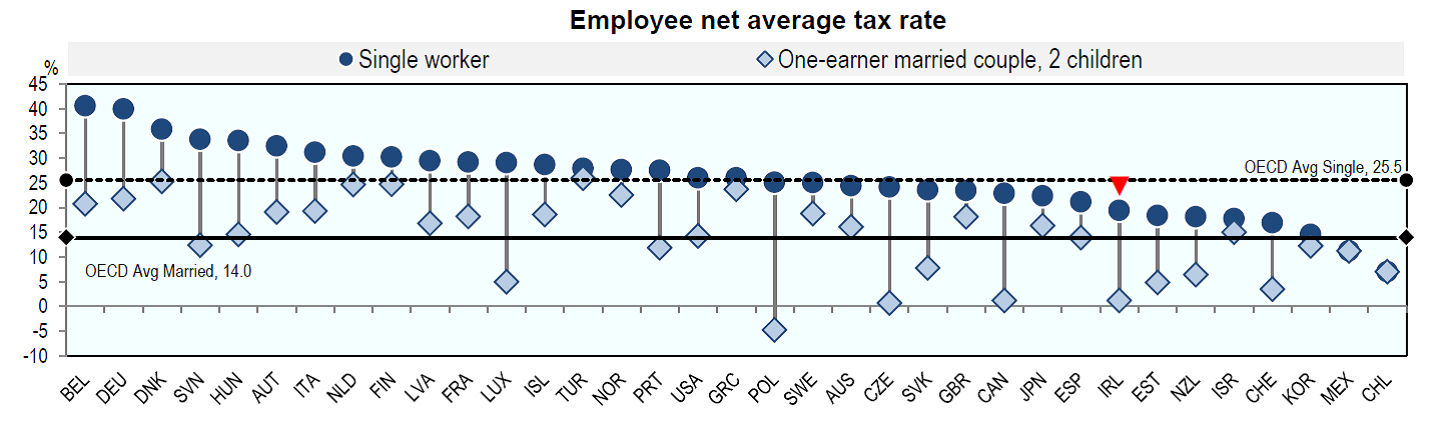
Irish employee tax rate (single and married) versus the OECD in 2017

The OECD's 2018 Taxing Wages shows Ireland's employee tax on wages, which is the total tax (PAYE and EE–PRSI less SS Benefits) paid by Irish employees, as a % of their gross wages, is also one of the lowest in the OECD. Of the 35 OECD members in 2017, the average Irish single-worker paid 19.4% versus the OECD average of 25.5% (ranked 28th–lowest), and the average Irish married worker paid 1.2% versus the OECD average of 14.0% (ranked 33rd–lowest).

In relation to the single worker, the OECD noted that a driver of the lower Irish rate is that EE–PRSI (or employee social security contributions) are lower in Ireland versus the OECD average. PAYE and ER–PRSI accounted for 87% of the Irish tax wedge for labour income, whereas for the OECD average it was 77%. In relation to the married worker, the OECD noted the additional effect of Irish child benefits and provisions which reduced the married-worker employee tax by 16.4%, whereas for the OECD average it was 9.8%. Ireland's lower EE–PRSI, and higher child benefits, have been noted in other studies.

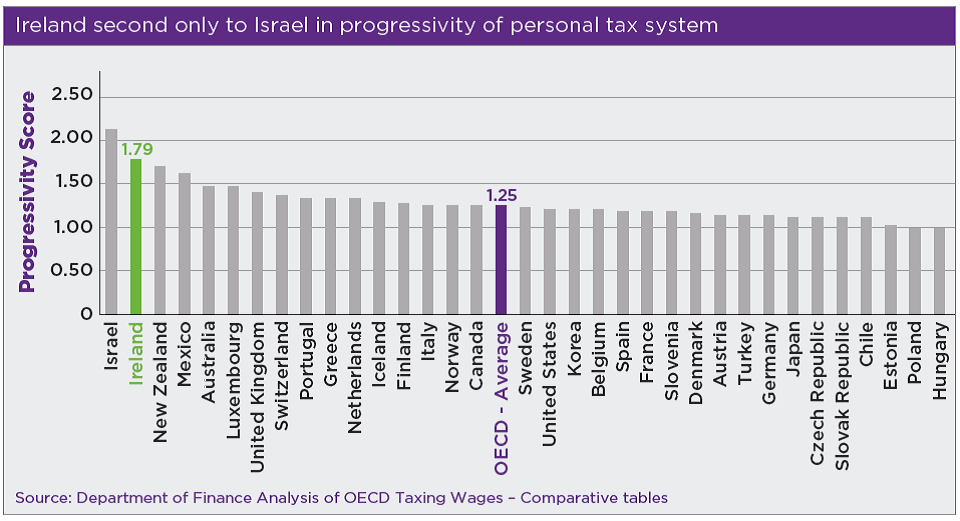
OECD 2015 Progressivity Ratio: Employment tax rate at 167% average wage vs. 67% average wage.

Aside from lower employee social security levies (e.g. EE–PRSI), the most distinctive aspect of Ireland's personal tax system is the level of Progressivity, as defined by the ratio of the employee tax (or tax wedge for income) at 167% of the average wage, to employee tax at 67% of the average wage. In October 2013, the Department of Finance Tax Policy Group, highlighted that Ireland has the most progressive personal tax system in the OECD. By September 2016, the Irish Tax Institute showed that Ireland was the 2nd most progressive personal tax system in the OECD.

The progressive nature of Ireland's personal tax system is also apparent in the distribution of Irish personal tax. In October 2013, the Department of Finance Tax Policy Group, highlighted the following personal tax (PAYE and EE–PRSI), statistics from the Irish Revenue Commissioners for the 2012 tax year:

- Top 1% of earners, earned over €200,000 in income and paid 20% of personal tax.
- Top 5% of earners, earned over €100,000 in income and paid 40% of personal tax.
- Top 23% of earners, earned earn over €50,000 in income and paid 77% of personal tax.
- Bottom 77% of earners, earned less than €50,000 in income and paid 23% of personal tax.

The above format of the Tax Policy Group has never been reproduced, in April 2018, the OECD and the Irish Revenue Commissioners disclosed that in 2015:

- Top 1% of earners, earned over €203,389 in income and paid 19% of personal tax.
- Top 10% of earners, earned over €77,530 in income and paid 61% of personal tax.

==== Consumption tax (VAT and Excise) ====
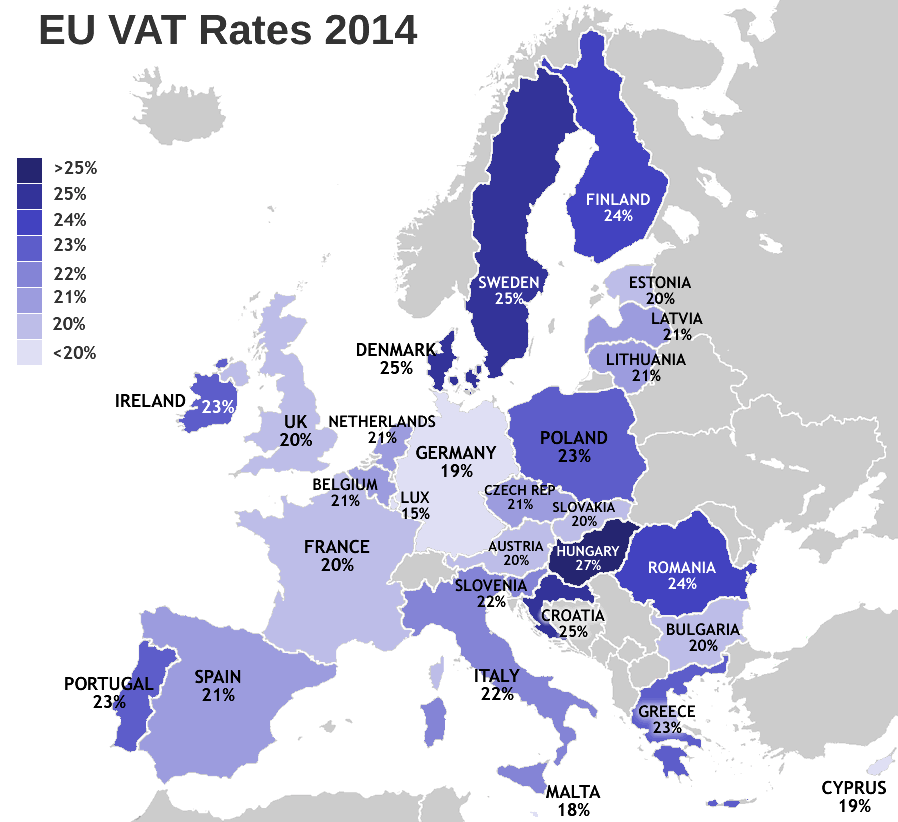
VAT rates in 2014 in the EU–28

Irish headline VAT is in line with EU VAT rates (see graphic). The OCED Revenue Statistics 2017 – Ireland, ranks Ireland as being below the OECD average for effective VAT (22nd–lowest out of 35 OECD countries), but in line with the OECD average for overall Consumption taxes (e.g. VAT and Excise combined), ranking 16th of out 35 OECD countries. In October 2013, the Department of Finance Tax Policy Group, highlighted that the distortion of Irish GDP impacted this metric and that Ireland's Consumption Tax as % of GNP ratio at 12%, and VAT as % of GNP ration at 8%, was at the EU–27 average for both metrics.

==== Corporate tax (CT) ====
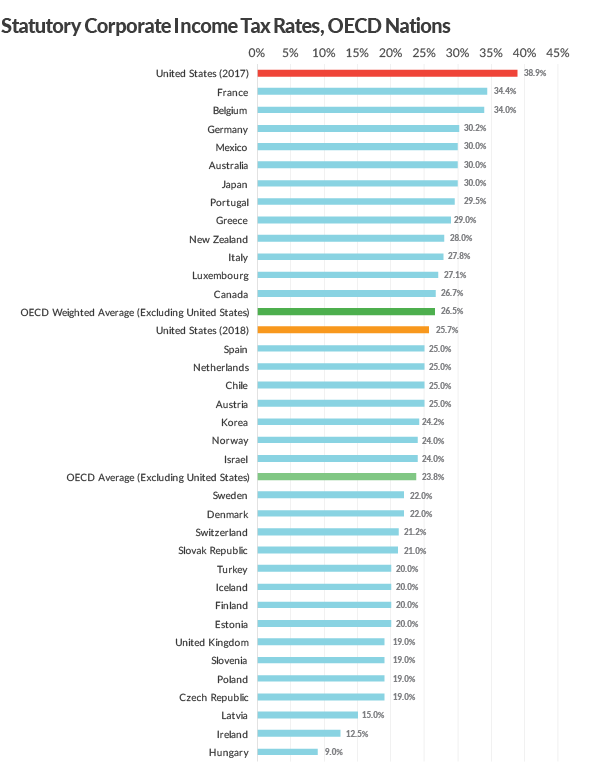
2018 headline corporate tax rates for all 35 OECD members (pre and post the 2017 U.S. TCJA)

Ireland's taxation system is distinctive for its low headline rate of corporation tax at 12.5% (for trading income), which is half the OECD average of 24.9%. While Ireland's corporate tax is only 16% of Total Net Revenues (see above), Ireland's corporate tax system is a central part of Ireland's economic model. Not only do foreign multinationals pay 80% of Ireland's corporation tax, but they also directly employ 10% of the Irish labour force, rising to 23% when Public Sector, agri and finance jobs are excluded and pay 50% of all Irish salary taxes using the same metric; in 2016, they were 57% of all Irish non-farm OECD value-add (see multinational economy). A source of controversy is the effective tax rate of Ireland corporation tax system, of which the independent evidence is that it is less than 4%, and as low as 0.005% for major U.S. multinationals (see Irish effective corporate tax rate).

Ireland's Corporate Tax System has seen Ireland labelled a tax haven, and in June 2018, academics estimated that Ireland was the largest global tax haven. Ireland's reputation as a tax haven for foreign multinationals to avoid global taxes contrasts with the fact that Ireland's overall tax receipts are in line with the EU and OECD averages (when properly adjusted using Irish GNI*, and not the distorted Irish GDP).

== Taxes on income (PAYE and PRSI) ==
=== Income tax ===
Income tax is charged in respect of all property, profits, or gains. Since 2002, Ireland has operated a tax year coinciding with the calendar year (1 January to 31 December). The change coincided with the introduction of the euro in Ireland. For administrative purposes, taxable income is expressed under four schedules:

- Schedule C: public revenue dividends (i.e. coupon payments on government debt)
- Schedule D
  - Case I: Profit arising from any trade, or from quarries, mines, works, tolls, fairs, bridges, and railways
  - Case II: Profit arising from any profession not contained in any other schedule
  - Case III: Interest on money or debts, annuities, discounts, profits on government debt not covered in schedule C, interest on certain government debt, income on securities outside the state not covered in schedule C, and income from possessions outside the state
  - Case IV: Tax in respect of any annual profits or gains not covered by any other case or schedule. There are also specific types of income specified by law to be taxed under case IV.
  - Case V: Tax in respect of rent or receipts from any easement
- Schedule E: Income from public offices, employment, annuities, and pensions.
- Schedule F: Dividends from Irish companies.

==== Rates of income tax ====
Since 1 January 2015, the tax rates apply as follows:

There are 2 tax brackets, 20% (the standard rate) and the balance of income at 40% (the higher rate). The brackets depend upon the individual's category.

Irish income tax brackets (2018)
Rate	Taxable earned income	Category
20%	0–€34,550	individuals without dependent children
20%	0–€38,550	single or widowed persons qualifying for the One-Parent Family tax credit
20%	0–€43,550	married couples
40%	earned income remainder	all categories

The €43,550 amount may, for married couples, be increased by the lesser of: €25,550 or the income of the second spouse. This brings the total maximum standard rate band for a married couple to €69,100, twice the single person's band. The increase is not transferable between spouses.

Irish income tax brackets (2019)

Rate	Taxable earned income	Category
20%	0–€35,300	individuals without dependent children
20%	0–€39,300	single or widowed persons qualifying for the One-Parent Family tax credit
20%	0–€44,300	married couples
40%	earned income remainder	all categories

The €44,300 amount may, for married couples, be increased by the lesser of: €26,300 or the income of the second spouse. This brings the total maximum standard rate band for a married couple to €70,600, little less than twice the single person's band. The increase is not transferable between spouses.

==== Tax credits ====
A taxpayer's tax liability is reduced by the amount of their tax credits, which replaced tax-free allowances in 2001. Tax credits are not refundable in the event that they exceed the amount of tax due, but may be carried forward within a year.

A wide range of tax credits are available. A few are awarded automatically, while others must be claimed by taxpayers.

The principal tax credit is the personal tax credit, which is currently €1,650 per year for a single person and €3,300 per year for a married couple. A widowed person in the year of bereavement, or for as long as they have dependent children, may claim the €3,300 credit as well; a higher credit is available to widowed parents during the five tax years following the bereavement.

The PAYE tax credit, which is also €1,650, is awarded to employees and others who pay tax under the Pay as you earn system (further details below), to compensate them for the time value of money effect; their tax is deducted from their incomes during the year, whereas the self-employed pay near the end of the year. The credit may not exceed 20% of the recipient's income during the year and it is not transferable between spouses.

==== Rules of residence ====
A person resident and domiciled in Ireland is liable to Irish income tax on their total income from all sources worldwide. In this sense, a person who spends:

- 183 days or more in Ireland during a tax year, or
- an aggregate of 280 days in the current and preceding tax year

is considered to be resident. Presence in Ireland of not more than 30 days in a tax year is ignored for the purposes of the two year test. Since 1 January 2009, a person is treated as present in Ireland for a day if present at any time during the day; before this, a person was only treated as present if he or she was present at midnight, a rule which was nicknamed the "Cinderella clause". A person may also elect to be resident in Ireland in a year in which he arrives in Ireland, once he can satisfy Revenue that he intends to remain there for the next tax year.

A person who is resident in Ireland for three consecutive years becomes ordinarily resident, and ceases to be ordinarily resident after he has been non-resident in Ireland for three consecutive years.

A person is domiciled in Ireland if born in Ireland; a person who has "demonstrated a positive intention of permanent residence in [a] new country" ceases to be domiciled in Ireland.

A person who is not an Irish resident but is ordinarily resident in Ireland is liable to tax on all Irish and foreign-sourced income in full, except for income from a trade, profession, office, or employment, the duties of which are entirely exercised outside Ireland, and on foreign income under €3,810 per year.

A person who is resident in Ireland, and is either ordinarily resident or domiciled in Ireland, but not both, is liable to tax on all Irish income in full, and on such foreign income as is remitted to Ireland.

A person who is neither resident, ordinarily resident, nor domiciled in Ireland is taxable on all Irish sourced income in full, and on foreign sourced income in respect of a trade, profession, or employment exercised in Ireland.

==== Exemption limits and marginal relief ====
A person aged 65 or over during the tax year is exempt from income tax if his or her income is under €18,000 per year. A married couple with income under €36,000 per year is also exempt if either spouse is aged 65 or over or reaches 65 during the year; the exemption amount is increased by €575 for each of the couple's first two dependent children and by €830 for each subsequent child.

A person or couple earning slightly over the limit may claim what is known as marginal relief. In this case, income over the exemption limit is charged to tax at a flat rate of 40%. A person or couple may choose to be taxed under marginal relief or the regular tax system, and will be granted whichever system is more beneficial, including retroactively.

==== Deductions from tax liabilities ====
Some items of expenditure can be deducted from a person's income for tax purposes, generally referred to as getting tax relief. In some cases the tax must be claimed retrospectively; in others it is processed as an increase to tax credits. The vast majority are only allowed at the standard tax rate of 20%.

===== Medical insurance =====
A person purchasing private medical insurance is entitled to tax relief at 20%, which is usually given at source – the person pays 80% of the cost, and the government pays the rest directly to the insurance company. Persons aged over 50 are entitled to a further tax credit, which is normally paid in full to the insurance company to offset the considerably higher cost incurred by insurers in respect of members over 50.

===== Medical expenses =====
Tax relief is available on medical expenses. With the exception of fees paid to approved nursing homes, the relief is only available retrospectively (i.e. by completing a tax return at the end of the year), and the relief is awarded at 20% since 2009. It can be claimed for a person's own expenses, or expenses which they pay on behalf of a relative, dependant, or, since 2007, anyone at all.

Medical expenses are construed widely, and include:

- Fees of doctors and consultants
- Prescription medicines (to a maximum of €144 per month, above which the Health Service Executive will repay the entire balance)
- Hospital costs
- Ambulance fees
- Non-routine dental treatments
- Nursing home expenses
- Special food for diabetics and coeliacs
- Overnight accommodation for a parent near a hospital where his or her child is being treated
- Travel expenses for dialysis patients or for the transport of children to and from hospital for children with life-threatening illnesses or permanent disabilities

The relief can be claimed in the year when the cost was incurred or in the year when the payment was made.

===== Permanent health insurance =====
A person may deduct from his income for the purposes of tax calculation up to 10% of that income which is spent on permanent health insurance. Relief is therefore given at 40% if the person is paying the higher rate of tax. If the payment is made by salary deduction the payment is treated as a benefit in kind (BIK) and as such is subject to the Universal Social Charge (USC) and PRSI.

===== Service charges =====
Tax relief is allowed on service charges paid to a local council for domestic sewage disposal, as well as all payments for domestic water supply or domestic refuse collection or disposal. The relief is allowed in arrears – credit for payments made in 2007 is given in 2008 – and is given at 20%, to a maximum of €80 (where €400 or more was paid for service charges). It will cease from 2011.

===== Tuition fees =====
Tax relief at 20% is allowed in respect of tuition fees paid for third-level courses, excluding the first €2,500 for a full-time course and €1,250 for a part-time course, of the course fees). The maximum relief available is €1,400 per year (20% of €7,000). Courses must be of at least two years duration, except for postgraduate courses which must be of at least one-year duration. The course must also be approved by Revenue and delivered in a college approved by Revenue.

As with medical expenses, since 2007 the relief could be claimed in respect of payments made by any person, irrespective of the relationship between payer and payee. It cannot be claimed in respect of administration, registration, or examination fees.

Relief is also allowed in respect of fees of over €315 for foreign-language or information technology courses approved by FÁS, of less than two years duration, which results in the award of a certificate of competence. The relief is for 20% of the amount paid, to a maximum of €254 (20% of €1,270) per course. It is not available for courses in the Irish or English languages.

===== Pension contributions =====
Contributions to a pension scheme can be deducted from gross income before calculation of tax; tax relief is therefore allowed on them at 40% if the contributor is paying tax at that rate. Contributions (including AVCs) are subject to the Universal Service Charge currently at 7%.

==== How tax is paid ====
Taxpayers pay either on a "pay as you earn" system or a "pay and file" system.

===== The 'Pay As You Earn' (PAYE) system =====
Employees, pensioners, and directors generally have tax deducted from their income by their employers as it is paid. Under this system, tax is calculated by the employer on each pay day, withheld, and paid over to Revenue. Employers receive notification of the tax credit and standard rate band applicable to the employee from Revenue. A PAYE employee need only file a tax return on form 12 if requested to do so by an inspector of taxes, if she has other undeclared income, or if she wishes to claim reliefs which are not available on another form.

===== Self-assessment =====
The self-assessment system applies to persons who are self-employed or who receive non-PAYE income. Under the self-assessment system, a taxpayer must:

- pay preliminary tax for the current tax year,
- pay any balance of tax due for the last tax year, and
- file a return of income on form 11 for the last tax year

by the deadline each year. The deadline is 31 October for paper filings. It has historically been extended to mid-November for returns filed online, but it is not clear whether this will continue.

Preliminary tax must be at least equal to the least of:

- 90% of tax for the current tax year
- 100% of tax for the previous tax year
- 105% of tax for the pre-preceding tax year (for payments by monthly direct debit)

Revenue will calculate the tax payable for a person who files a return of income more than two months prior to the filing deadline.

Underpaid tax attracts an interest penalty charge of 0.0219% per day, and underpayments may result in a surcharge, prosecution, or publication of their name in a defaulters' list.

=== Universal Social Charge (USC) ===
The Universal Social Charge (USC) is a tax on income that replaced both the income levy and the health levy (also known as the health contribution) since 1 January 2011. It is charged on a person's gross income before any pension contributions or PRSI.

If a person's income is less than €13,000 they pay no Universal Social Charge (USC). (This limit was €4,004 in 2011, €10,036 from 2012 to 2014 and €12,012 in 2015.) Once income is over this limit, a person pays the relevant rate of USC on all income. For example, a person with income of €13,000 will pay no USC. A person with income of €13,001 will pay 0.5% on income up to €12,012 and 2.5% on income between €12,012 and €13,001.

Aggregate income for USC purposes does not include payments from the Department of Social Protection.

==== Standard Rates of USC (2018) ====
Rate	Income Band
0.5%	Up to €12,012
2%	From €12,012.01 to €19,372.00
4.75%	From €19,372.01 to €70,044.00
8%	From €70,044.01 to €100,000.00
8%	Any PAYE income over €100,000
11%	Non-PAYE (Self-employed) income over €100,000

==== Reduced Rates of USC (2018) ====
Rate	Income Band
0.5%	Income up to €12,012
2%	All income over €12,012

Reduced rates of USC apply to:

- People aged 70 or over whose aggregate income for the year is €60,000 or less
- Medical card holders aged under 70 whose aggregate income for the year is €60,000 or less

=== Pay Related Social Insurance (PRSI) ===
PRSI is paid by employees, employers, and the self-employed as a percentage of wages after pension contributions. It includes social insurance and a health contribution. Social insurance payments are used to help pay for social welfare payments and pensions. Each week's payment earns the employee a "credit" or "contribution", which credits are used to establish entitlements to non-means-tested welfare payments such as Jobseeker's Benefit and the State Pension (contributory). The health contribution is used to help fund the health services, although paying it does not confer any entitlement to treatment or anything else. For the most part, the two amounts are combined and stated as one deduction on payslips. There was a ceiling of €75,036 per year on the employee social insurance element of the payment but this ceiling was abolished from 2011 onwards.

==== Class A ====
Class A workers are employees aged under 66 in industrial, commercial, and service-type employment who are paid more than €38 a week from all employments, as well as to public servants recruited from 6 April 1995. Class A employees earning under €352 per week are placed in subclass AO, and pay no PRSI. Class A employees earning between €352 and €356 are in subclass AX; those earning over €356 but less than or equal to €500 are in subclass AL. Both subclasses pay 4% PRSI, and the first €127 of earnings are no longer disregarded for this calculation, so therefore PRSI is 4% on all earnings/ Class A employees earning over €500 per week are in subclass A1 and pay 4% on all their weekly earnings.

Employers of employees in the above classes pay 8.5% PRSI for employees earning under €356 per week and 10.75% PRSI for employees earning over that amount. The applicable rate applies on the entire wage, with no ceiling. Classes A4, A5, A6, A7, A8, and A9 relate to community employment schemes and employer's PRSI exemption schemes. Class A8 is for income under €352 per week and has no employee PRSI liability; class A9 is for income over that amount and is liable at a flat rate of 4%. Both classes have an employer's PRSI rate of 0.5%.

==== Classes B, C, and D ====
Class B workers are permanent and pensionable civil servants recruited before 6 April 1995, doctors and dentists employed in the civil service, and gardaí recruited before 6 April 1995. Class B workers earning under €352 per week are placed in subclass BO, and pay no PRSI. Class B workers earning between €352 and €500 per week are placed in subclass BX, and class B workers earning over €500 per week but exempt from the health contribution are placed in subclass B2. Both these subclasses pay 0.9% PRSI on all earnings except the first €26 per week. Class B workers earning over €500 per week and not exempt from the health contribution are placed in subclass B1. They pay 4% PRSI on the first €26 of their weekly earnings, 4.9% on the next €1,417, and 5.9% on the balance.

Class C workers are commissioned officers of the defence forces, and members of the army nursing service, recruited before 6 April 1995. Class D workers are all permanent and pensionable employees in the public service not caught in classes B or C, recruited before 6 April 1995. Workers in classes C and D pay PRSI at the same rates as class B.

Employers of class B employees pay a flat rate of 2.01% PRSI on all their employees' earnings; for class C, the rate is 1.85%, and for class D it is 2.35%, although this is effectively a transfer of money from one government account to another.

==== Class H ====
Class H workers are non-commissioned officers and enlisted personnel of the Defence Forces. Class H workers earning under €352 per week are placed in subclass HO, and pay no PRSI. Class H workers earning from €352 to €500 per week are placed in subclass HX. Class H workers earning over €500 and exempt from the health contribution are placed in subclass H2. Workers in each of these classes pay 3.9% PRSI on their earnings except for the first €127 per week. Other class H workers are placed in subclass H1. They pay 4% PRSI on the first €127 of their weekly earnings, 7.9% on the next €1,316, and 8.9% on the balance. Employers of class H workers pay 10.05% PRSI on all their employees' earnings.

==== Class J ====
Class J workers are employees aged 66 or over, those earning under €38 per week, or those in subsidiary employment. They pay only the health contribution of 4% if their earnings exceed €500 per week, or 5% on the amount that exceeds €1,443 per week. The employer's contribution is 0.5%. Subsidiary employment includes the employment of a person subject to class B, C, D, or H in his main employment.

==== Classes K and M ====
Classes K and M apply to income which is subject to the health contribution but not to social insurance, including occupational pensions. It also applies to judges, state solicitors, and income of self-employed persons aged 66 or over.

Class K income is subject to the health contribution of 4% if earnings exceed €500 per week, or 5% on the amount that exceeds €1,443 per week. There is no employer contribution.

Class M relates to persons under 16, who are exempt from PRSI entirely, and to income which would fall under class K paid to persons exempt from the health contribution. It has a zero rate.

==== Class S ====
Self-employed people, including certain company directors, pay class S PRSI; the class also applies to certain investment and rental income.

Where income is less than €500 per week, subclass S0 applies. Where income is above €500 per week, subclass S1 applies, except to persons exempt from the health contribution, to whom subclass S2 applies. The rate for subclasses S0 and S2 is 3%, and the rate for subclass S1 is 7% up to €1,443 per week and 8% on that portion of income above that amount.

==== Health contribution ====
The health contribution was replaced by the USC from 2011 onwards

==== How PRSI is paid ====
Taxpayers paying class S PRSI pay it, and the health contribution, along with their tax. For other taxpayers, it is withheld from their net income.

== Taxes on Consumption (VAT and Excise) ==
=== Value added tax (VAT) ===
Value-Added Tax (VAT) is a transaction tax on Irish consumer spending, and almost all goods and services supplied in Ireland are subject to VAT. Goods imported into Ireland from outside the EU are also subject to VAT, which is charged by Customs at the border. Irish VAT is part of the European Union Value Added Tax system and each Member State is required to impose the EU VAT legislation by way of its own domestic legislation, however, there are key differences between the rules for each state. All non-exempt traders are required to register for VAT and collect VAT on the goods and services they supply. Each trader in the chain of supply, from manufacturer to retailer, charges VAT on their sales and incurs VAT on their raw materials; they pay the Irish Revenue their net VAT.

==== Registration thresholds ====
A trader whose turnover exceeds the registration thresholds, or is likely to exceed them in the next 12 months, must register for VAT.

The registration thresholds are as follows:

- The basic threshold is €75,000 (provided no more than 10% of turnover comes from services and none of the other conditions below are met).
- The threshold for a person supplying services, making mail-order or distance sales into Ireland, or supplying goods liable at the VAT rates of 13.5% or 21% which he manufactures from zero-rated materials is €37,500.
- The threshold for a person making intra-EU acquisitions is €41,000.
- There is no threshold for a non-established person supplying taxable goods or services in Ireland, or for a person receiving so-called Fourth Schedule services (intangible, remotely provided services, like advertising, broadcasting, and telecommunications services) from abroad — any such person must register for VAT.

A person below these limits may register voluntarily. It is often beneficial for persons who mainly trade with other businesses to register for VAT even when their turnover is below the relevant limits.

==== VAT rates ====
VAT rates range from 0% on books, children's clothing and educational services and items, to 23% on the majority of goods. The 13.5% rate applies to many labour-intensive services as well as to restaurant meals, hot takeaway food, and bakery products. A 4.8% rate applies to supply of livestock and greyhounds. A 5.4% "flat rate addition" applies to the agricultural sector, although this is not strictly VAT – it is charged by farmers not registered for VAT to compensate them for VAT which they must pay to their suppliers. The flat rate addition is not paid away to the Revenue.

Traders collecting VAT can deduct the VAT incurred on their purchases from their VAT liability, and where the VAT paid exceeds VAT received, can claim a refund. The VAT period is normally two calendar months (other filing periodicity, such as four-monthly, and semi-annual also apply in certain circumstances).

A VAT return is made on the 19th day of the following the end of the period. However, if a person submits the return on the website, i.e. ROS ("Revenue Online Service"), and also performs payment via ROS, then the due date is extended to the 23rd day following the end of the period.

Once a year a detailed breakdown of VAT returns must be prepared by traders and submitted to the government – traders may choose their own date for this. Traders with low VAT liabilities may opt for six-monthly or four-monthly payments instead of the standard bi-monthly one, and traders who are generally in the position of claiming repayments of VAT rather than making payments may make monthly returns.

=== Excise Duty ===
Excise tax is charged on mineral oil, tobacco, and alcohol.

- Mineral oil includes hydrocarbon oil, liquefied petroleum gas, substitute fuel, and additives. Hydrocarbon oil includes petroleum oil, oil produced from coal, bituminous substances, and liquid hydrocarbons, but not substances that are solid or semi-solid at 15 °C In addition to the tax, a carbon charge is applicable to petrol, aviation gasoline, and heavy oil used as a propellant, for air navigation, or for private pleasure navigation, and this was scheduled to be extended in May 2010 to apply to other uses of heavy oil and liquefied petroleum gas, and to natural gas.
- Tobacco excise applies to tobacco products, including cigars, cigarettes, cavendish, hard-pressed tobacco, pipe tobacco, and other smoking or chewing tobacco. The increased rate of tax will bring prices for cigerettes up by 50c per packet as outlined in the Irish Budget 2018.
- Alcohol and alcoholic beverages duty applies to alcohol products produced in Ireland or imported into Ireland. As of 2016 tax over a bottle of wine is over 50%.

== Corporation tax (CT) ==
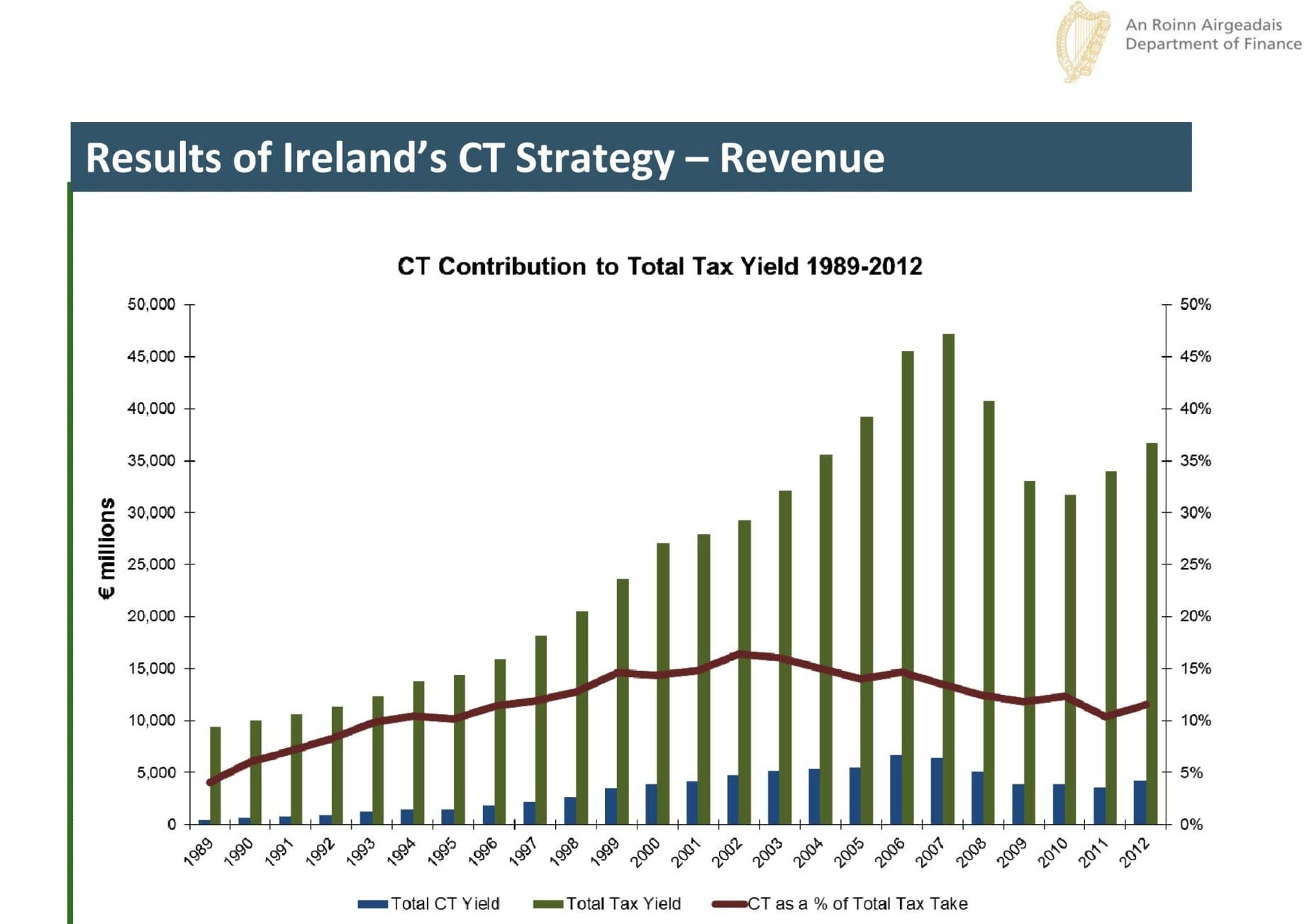
Irish Corporation Tax as a % Total Irish Tax has between 10% and 16% of Total Irish Tax.

Irish corporation tax returns have historically been between 10% and 16% of total Irish net Tax Revenues, however, since 2015, corporation tax has risen sharply, doubling in scale from 4.6 billion in 2014 to 8.2 billion in 2017; the Revenue Commissioners state that foreign multinationals pay circa 80% of Irish corporation tax.

As of November 2018, there are two rates of corporation tax ("CT") in the Republic of Ireland:

- a 12.5% headline rate (Note: In Effective Tax Rates it is shown that Ireland's true CT tax rate for foreign multinationals is between 0% and 3% depending on what particular Irish BEPS tools are used. Effective Tax Rates also shows that the aggregate CT tax rate in Ireland is between 2% and 4.5% depending on various assumptions.) for trading income (or active businesses income in the Irish tax code); trading relates to a business enterprise;
- a 25.0% headline rate (Note: Ireland offers specific Central Bank of Ireland–regulated SPVs that foreign investors in passive Irish income can use avoid the 25% rate (and all other Irish taxes and duties), on Irish assets. The main vehicles are the Irish QIAIF and the Irish Section 110 SPV. Public tax scandals in Ireland in 2016, revealed because Irish Section 110 SPVs have to file Irish public accounts, led to the Central Bank of Ireland to introduce the L–QIAIF vehicle to replace the Section 110 SPV for foreign investors who want to avoid the 25% passive income tax in a confidential manner. QIAIFs and L–QIAIFs do not have to file Irish public accounts; instead filing confidential accounts with the Central Bank of Ireland which are protected under the Central Bank Secrecy Act of 1942.) for non-trading income (or passive income in the Irish tax code); covering investment income (e.g. income from buying and selling assets), rental income from real estate, net profits from foreign trades, and income from certain land dealings and income from oil, gas and mineral exploitations.

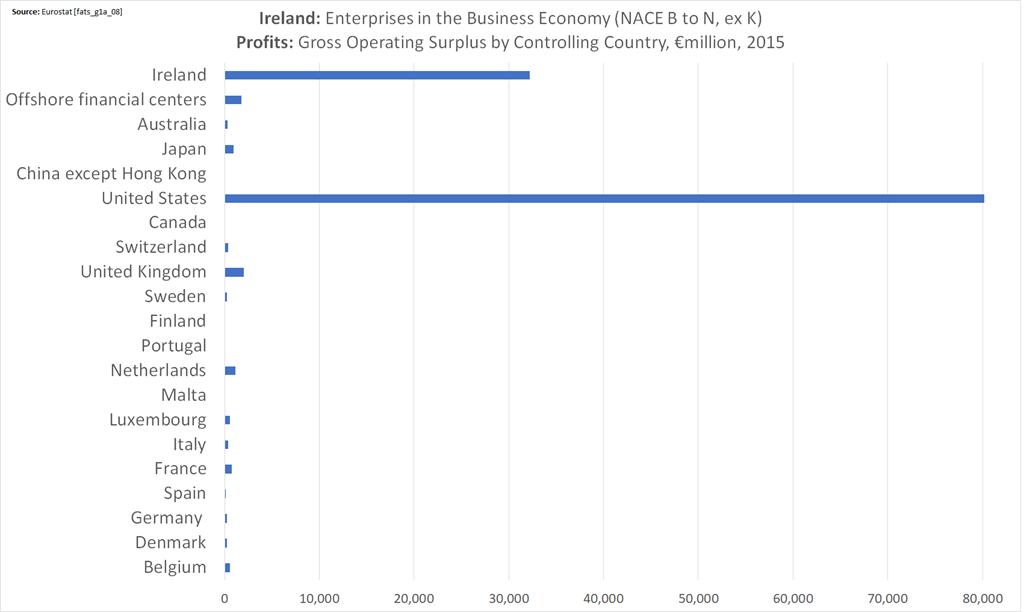
Irish Gross Operating Surplus (i.e. profits), by the controlling country of the company (note: a material part of the Irish figure is also from U.S. tax inversions who are U.S.–controlled). Eurostat (2015).

The special 10% tax rate for manufacturing in Ireland (introduced from 1980/81), and for financial services in the special economic zone of the International Financial Services Centre in Dublin (introduced from 1987), have now been phased out since 2010 and 2003 respectively, and are no longer in operation.

As of November 2018, Ireland's corporate tax system is a "worldwide tax" system, with no thin capitalisation rules, and a holding company regime for tax inversions to Ireland. Ireland has the most U.S. corporate tax inversions, and Medtronic (2015) was the largest U.S. tax inversion in history.

Ireland's corporate tax system has base erosion and profit shifting (BEPS) tools, such as the Double Irish (used by Google and Facebook), the Single Malt (used by Microsoft and Allergan), and the Capital Allowances for Intangible Assets (CAIA) (used by Accenture, and by Apple post Q1 2015); in June 2018, academics showed they are the largest global BEPS tools. In a phenomenon sometimes referred to as "leprechaun economics", Apple's 2015 restructure of its BEPS tools inflated Irish GDP by 34.4%.

Ireland's tax system also offers SPVs that can be used by foreign investors to avoid the 25% corporate tax on passive income from Irish assets, which are covered in more detail in Irish Section 110 Special Purpose Vehicle (SPV), and in Qualifying investor alternative investment fund (QIAIF). The Irish QIAIF is a Central Bank of Ireland regulatory classification that includes the Irish Collective Asset-management Vehicle or ICAV, and the L-QIAIF.

== Capital gains tax (CGT) ==
Capital gains tax is payable where a person makes a gain on the sale of assets, called chargeable assets. The standard CGT rate is 33% in respect of disposals made from midnight on 7 December 2013. The rate of tax for disposals made in previous years is less: details can be obtained from the Revenue Commissioners.

=== Persons affected ===
Any person (including a company) resident or ordinarily resident in Ireland is liable to CGT on all chargeable gains accruing on all disposals of chargeable assets. A person resident or ordinarily resident, but not domiciled, in Ireland is only liable to CGT on disposals of assets outside of Ireland where the gains are remitted to Ireland.

A person neither resident nor ordinarily resident in Ireland is only liable to CGT on gains from:

1. Land and buildings in Ireland
2. Minerals or mining rights in Ireland
3. Exploration or exploitation rights in a designated area of the Irish Continental Shelf
4. Shares (not quoted on a stock exchange) deriving their value from any or all of items 1, 2, or 3
5. Assets in Ireland used for the purpose of a business carried on in Ireland

=== Calculation ===
The gain or loss is calculated as the sale price less the purchase price. From the sale price can be deducted the cost of acquisition of the asset, including incidental costs such as conveyancing costs, the cost of the disposal, and costs of improving the asset.

Where the asset was acquired prior to 6 April 1974, its value on that date is used instead of the purchase price.

The purchase price, cost of acquisition, and costs of improvement can be adjusted for inflation from 6 April 1974 up to 31 December 2002, and a table is published by Revenue for the purpose of calculating this adjustment. The inflation adjustment can only operate to reduce a gain; it cannot increase a loss or turn a gain into a loss.

=== Offsetting ===
Capital losses can be offset against capital gains arising in the same or later tax year. Non-chargeable losses (see below) cannot be offset against chargeable gains. In each tax year losses carried forward must be used before exemptions are applied.

=== Exemptions and reliefs ===
- The first €1,270 of net gains by an individual each year are not chargeable. The exemption is not transferable between spouses and cannot be carried forward from year to year.
- Certain assets are designated non-chargeable assets, including:
  - Government securities
  - Savings certificates and savings bonds
  - Land bonds
  - Securities issued by certain semi-state bodies
- Certain gains/losses are not chargeable, including:
  - National Instalment Savings bonuses and Prize Bond prizes
  - Gains from life assurance policies or deferred annuity contracts, except those purchased from another person or taken out after May 1993 with certain foreign insurers
  - Gains on the disposal of wasting chattels, for example animals and motor cars
  - Gains on the disposal of tangible non-wasting movable property worth €2,540 or less on disposal (the disposal of a set of articles to one person or to connected persons is considered a single disposal)
  - Gains accruing to local authorities, and some gains accruing to pension funds, trade unions, and charities
  - Gains from betting, lotteries, and sweepstakes
- Gains from the sale by an individual of his/her principal private residence (including up to 0.4 hectares of land) are not chargeable. If only part of the premises is a principal private residence, the relief is allowed on a proportionate basis. This relief does not apply where land is sold as development land.
- The transfer by a parent to his/her child of a site where the child will construct a principal private residence is exempt from CGT as long as the child lives there for at least three years.
- The sale by a person aged over 55 of a business or farm for under €0.5m, or to a family member, is exempt.

Transfers between spouses do not give rise to a charge for capital gains tax; the acquiring spouse is considered to have acquired the property on the same date and at the same price as the disposing spouse.

=== Payment ===
CGT is a self-assessment tax for all taxpayers. Tax on gains realised in the first eleven months of the year is payable by 15 December that year, and tax on gains realised in December payable by 31 January the next year. A return must be made by 31 October in the following year with full details of the gain.

A person purchasing a chargeable asset for over €500,000 must withhold 15% of the price and pay it to Revenue unless the Revenue has issued a CG50A certificate to the vendor prior to the purchase. The certificate CG50A is issued by the Revenue on application, provided that either the vendor is resident in Ireland, no CGT is payable on the disposal, or the CGT has already been paid.

== Deposit interest retention tax ==
Deposit Interest Retention Tax (abbreviated as DIRT), is a retention tax charged on interest earned on bank accounts, as well as some other investments. It was first introduced in Ireland in the 1980s to reduce tax evasion on unearned income.

DIRT is deducted at source by financial institutions From 1 January 2014, DIRT is charged at 41% (was 33% in 2013) for payments made annually or more frequently. The tax is deducted by the bank or other deposit-taker before the interest is paid. DIRT will be charged at 36% (in 2013, lower rates in previous years) for payments made less frequently. This higher D.I.R.T. rate has been abolished, as and from 1 January 2014, and the D.I.R.T. rate of 41% applies to any interest paid or credited on these deposits on or after 1 January 2014.

Persons aged over 65 or incapacitated, whose income is less than the exemption limit (currently €20,000), may claim a refund of DIRT, or may submit an appropriate form to their banks or financial institutions to have interest paid free of DIRT.

DIRT does not apply to:

- Interest on deposits where the beneficial owner is a non-resident
- Deposits of companies which are chargeable to corporation tax
- Deposits of Revenue-approved pension schemes
- Deposits belonging to charities

== Stamp duties ==
Stamp duty is charged on the conveyance of residential property, non-residential property, and long leases, and also on company share transfers, bank cheques and cards (i.e. ATM cards and credit cards), and insurance policies.

=== Conveyance of property ===
Stamp duty is charged as a percentage of the consideration paid for immovable property, including goodwill attached to a business. A stamp duty return must be completed online for all such conveyances; physical stamps are no longer attached to documents.

==== On residential property ====
First time buyers (i.e. those who have not purchased a house before in Ireland or in any other jurisdiction) are exempt. One may also qualify as a first-time buyer if newly divorced or separated. New owner-occupied houses or apartments with a floor area of less than 125 m^{2} may also be exempt, and new owner-occupied houses with a floor area larger than this are assessed based on the greater of the cost of the site or quarter of the total cost of the house and site. In all cases, the rates exclude VAT.

For deeds executed on or after 8 December 2010 the rates of stamp duty are:.

- the first €1,000,000: 1%,
- excess over €1,000,000: 2%,

==== On non-residential property ====
Since 14 October 2008, conveyances of non-residential property are charged at an increasing rate starting at 0% for a property under the value of €10,000 rising to 6% for transactions over €80,000.

==== Exemptions and reliefs ====
Transfers between spouses are exempt from stamp duty, as are property transfers as a result of a court order in relation to a divorce. The stamp duty rate is halved for transfers between other blood relatives. Intragroup transactions, company reconstructions and amalgamations, and demutualisations, as well as certain transactions involving charities, approved sports bodies, young farmers, woodlands, or intellectual property also attract relief.

=== Stocks and shares ===
There is a 1% stamp duty on transfers of stock or marketable securities of any company incorporated in Ireland, except paper-based transfers where the consideration is €1,000 or less.

=== Bank cards and cheques ===
Credit card and charge card accounts are subject to a €30 annual duty. Automated teller machine and debit cards are subject to €2.50 each annually. Cards which perform both functions are subject to the tax twice, i.e. €5 total. Cards that are unused in the entire year are not chargeable. The credit card tax is applied per account, but the ATM and debit card charge is per card. In each case, where an account is closed during the year, there is an exemption from double taxation.

Cheques (technically, all bills of exchange) incur a €0.50 tax, generally collected by the bank on issue of each chequebook. Non-life Insurance policies are subject to a 3% levy and Life assurance policies are subject to a 1% levy on premiums from 1 June 2009.

== Capital acquisitions tax (CAT) ==
Capital acquisitions tax is charged to the recipient of gifts or inheritances, at the rate of 33% above a tax-free threshold. Gifts and inheritances are gratuitous benefits; the difference is that an inheritance is taken on death and a gift is taken other than on death.

The person providing the property is called the donor or disponer, or testator or deceased in the case of inheritance; the person receiving the property is called the beneficiary, donee or disponee, or the successor in the case of inheritance.

A gift is taken when a donee becomes beneficially entitled in possession to some property without paying full consideration for it. Tax is payable within four months of the date of the gift; an interest charge applies to late payments.

Tax is generally charged on the property's taxable value, which is computed as:

Market value

less liabilities costs and expenses payable out of the gift or inheritance

= incumbrance free value

less consideration paid by acquirer in money or money's worth

= taxable value

=== Taxable transfers ===
A disposition is taxable in Ireland if it is of property in Ireland, or if either the disponer or the beneficiary was resident or ordinarily resident in Ireland at the date of the disposition. Special rules apply for discretionary trusts.

=== Exemptions and reliefs ===
CAT can be reduced or eliminated altogether under a number of headings.

==== Exemption thresholds ====
Historically group thresholds were indexed by reference to the Consumer Price Index. The indexation of the tax-free group thresholds is abolished for gifts and inheritances taken on or after 7 December 2011. The thresholds on or after 9 October 2019 are:

- €335,000 (Group A) where the beneficiary's relationship to the disponer is: son or daughter, minor child of a predeceased son or daughter. Child includes a foster child (since 6 December 2000) and an adopted child (since 30 March 2001).
- €32,500 (Group B), where the beneficiary's relationship to the disponer is: lineal ancestor (e.g. parent), lineal descendant (not within A; e.g. granddaughter), brother or sister, nephew or niece.
- €16,250 (Group C) where the beneficiary's relationship to the disponer is: cousin or stranger.

For gifts and inheritances taken on or after 5 December 2001, only prior benefits received since 5 December 1991 from the same beneficiary within the same group threshold are aggregated with the current benefit in computing tax payable on the current benefit.

An inheritance, but not a gift, taken by a parent from his or her child is treated as group A, where it is an immediate interest (but not a life interest) in property. In certain circumstances, the beneficiary may take the place of his/her deceased spouse for the purpose of determining the applicable group where that spouse died before the disponer and was a nearer relative to the disponer.

==== Other exemptions ====
The other main exemptions from capital acquisitions tax are:

- Property passing between spouses is exempt from CAT. The exemption also applies to property passing by Court order between separated or divorced couples.
- Principal private residence. To qualify, the recipient must have lived: for three years ending on the transfer date in the residence, or for three of the four years ending on the transfer date in the residence and the residence which it has replaced. In addition, the recipient must not have any other private residence and they must not dispose of the residence for six years after the transfer to them.
- The first €3,000 of gifts taken in each calendar year by a beneficiary from a disponer is exempt.
- A gift or inheritance taken for public or charitable purposes is exempt.
- Objects of national, scientific, historic, or artistic interest, which the public are allowed to view, are exempt. This relief also extends to heritage property owned through a private company.
- Pension lump sums are exempt.
- Certain government securities acquired by a beneficiary who is not domiciled or resident in the State from a disponer who held them for at least three years.
- Personal injury compensation or damages, and lottery winnings are exempt. This exemption also covers reasonable support, maintenance, or education payments received by a minor child at a time when the disponer and the child's other parent are dead.
- Property acquired under a self-made disposition is exempt.
- An inheritance by a parent from a child, where the child took a non-exempt gift or inheritance from either parent within the past five years, is exempt.

==== Reliefs ====
The other main reliefs from capital acquisitions tax are:

- A surviving spouse may take the place and relationship status in respect of property acquired by the deceased spouse.
- Agricultural relief: This applies to a farmer – an individual who on the valuation date is domiciled in the State, and at least 80% of the gross market value of his assets consists of agricultural property (i.e., farm land and buildings, crops, trees and underwood, livestock, bloodstock, and farm machinery). The relief is a 90% reduction of the full market value. The relief may be withdrawn if the property is later disposed of within six years of the date of the gift or inheritance and the proceeds are not reinvested within one year of the disposal (six years in the case of a compulsory acquisition).
- Business relief: This applies to relevant business property, i.e., a sole trade business, an interest in a partnership, and unquoted shares in an Irish incorporated company. The relief is a 90% reduction of the taxable value. The relief may be withdrawn if the property is later disposed of within six years of the date of the gift or inheritance and the proceeds are not reinvested within one year of the disposal.
- Favorite nephew (or niece) relief.
- Double taxation in respect of US and UK equivalent taxes.
- The proceeds of a life assurance policy taken out to pay inheritance tax or gift tax.
- If the same event gives rise to a liability to both CAT and CGT, the CGT charge may be credited against the CAT up to the amount of the CAT charg.e

=== CAT Return ===
When a person receives a gift or inheritance that, either by itself, or aggregated with prior benefits taken by the donee, would place him in a position of having used up more than 80% of any group threshold, he must complete form IT38 and return it to Revenue within four months, along with any tax due.

=== Discretionary trust tax ===
Assets placed in discretionary trusts are subject to:

- a once-off charge of 6%, and
- an annual charge of 1%.

The charges must be paid within three months of the "valuation date", which may be the date the trust was set up, the date of death of the settlor, the earliest date on which the trustees could retain the trust property, the date on which the trustees retained the trust property, or the date of delivery of the trust property to the trustees.

== Withholding taxes ==
Several charges described as taxes are not, in the literal sense, actual taxes, but withholdings from certain payments made. In each case, the payer withholds the relevant percentage and pays it to Revenue. The recipient is still liable for tax on the full amount, but can set the withholding against his overall tax liability. If the amount withheld is less than the tax payable, the recipient is still liable for the difference, and if the amount withheld exceeds the tax payable, the recipient can set it off against other tax due, or obtain a refund. This contrasts with DIRT, which, while a withholding tax, discharges the entire tax liability of the recipient.

=== Relevant Contracts Tax ===
Relevant Contracts Tax (RCT) is a withholding regime applied to contractors in the forestry, construction, and meat processing sectors where tax non-compliance levels have historically been high.

On 13 December 2011, the Minister for Finance signed the Commencement Order for the new electronic RCT system which was introduced on 1 January 2012. All principal contractors in the construction, forestry and meat processing sectors are obliged to engage electronically with Revenue. Under the new RCT system, a principal contractor must provide Revenue with details of the contract and the subcontractor. It must also notify Revenue of all relevant payments online before payment is made. Revenue will respond to the payment notification with a deduction authorisation setting out how much tax, if any, must be withheld. The rates are currently set at 0%, 20% or 35%. This deduction authorisation is sent electronically to the principal contractor. The principal must provide a copy or details of the deduction authorisation to the subcontractor if tax has been deducted. The subcontractor can set off the amount deducted against any tax he is liable to pay, or reclaim the difference where the deduction exceeds the amount of tax.

Since September 2008, the subcontractor no longer charges or accounts for VAT on supplies of construction services to which RCT applies. Instead, the principal contractor must account for the VAT to Revenue (although he will generally be entitled to an input credit for the same amount). This system is referred to as the VAT reverse charge.

=== Dividend Withholding Tax ===
Dividend Withholding Tax is deducted at the rate of 20% from dividends paid by Irish companies. It can be set off against income tax due, or reclaimed where the recipient of the dividend is not liable to tax.

=== Professional Services Withholding Tax ===
Professional Services Withholding Tax (PSWT) is deducted at the rate of 20% from payments made by government bodies, health boards, state bodies, local authorities, and the like, from payments made for professional services. Professional services include medical, dental, pharmaceutical, optical, aural, veterinary, architectural, engineering, quantity surveying, accounting, auditing, finance, marketing, advertising, legal, and geological services, as well as training services supplied to FÁS It can be deducted from the tax ultimately payable by the service provider, or where the provider is non-resident or exempt from tax, reclaimed.

== Other taxes ==
An assortment of other taxes are charged in Ireland, which do not fit under any other heading.

=== Local Property Tax (LPT) ===
This was introduced in the Finance Act of 2013. This tax was levied for most properties at 0.18% of the self-assessed market value. The value assessed was initially the market value in May 2013. A higher rate of 0.25% of market value – the so-called Mansion Tax applies to properties valued at greater than €1,000,000.

=== Plastic bag levy ===
Since March 2002, a levy, called the Environmental Levy, has applied to the supply of plastic shopping bags by retailers. The levy is currently 22 cents per plastic bag. s The levy does not apply to:

- Small bags used solely to contain any of the following, whether packaged or not:
  - Fresh fish and fresh fish products
  - Fresh meat and fresh meat products
  - Fresh poultry and fresh poultry products
- Small bags used solely to contain unpackaged:
  - Fruit, nuts, or vegetables
  - Confectionery
  - Dairy products
  - Cooked food, whether cold or hot
  - Ice
- Bags supplied on board an aircraft or ship
- Bags supplied airside in an airport or in the passenger-only area of a port, for the purpose of carrying the goods on board an aeroplane or ship
- Bags sold for 70-cent or more

A small bag is one smaller than 225mm wide, 345mm deep, and 450mm long (including handles). The law requires that the levy be passed on to customers.

=== Vehicle Registration Tax ===
Vehicle Registration Tax or VRT is chargeable on registration of a motor vehicle in Ireland, and every motor vehicle brought into the country, other than temporarily by a visitor, must be registered with Revenue and must have VRT paid for it by the end of the working day after it arrives in the country.

Vehicles are assessed under five categories for VRT, depending on the type of vehicle.

- Category A includes cars, jeeps, and minibuses having fewer than 12 seats, not including the driver. The tax chargeable is based on carbon dioxide emissions per kilometre, ranging from 14% of open market selling price (for vehicles emitting under 120g CO_{2}/km) to 36% of open market selling price (for vehicles emitting over 226g CO_{2}/km).
- Category B includes car- and jeep-derived vans. The rate of VRT is 13.3% of the open market selling price, with a minimum of €125.
- Category C includes commercial vehicles, tractors, and buses having at least 13 seats (including the driver). The VRT chargeable is €50.
- Category D includes ambulances, fire engines, and vehicles used for the transportation of road construction machinery. Vehicles in category D are exempt from VRT.

==== Motorcycles ====
Motorcycles and motor scooters are chargeable for VRT by reference to the engine displacement, at a rate of €2 per cc for the first 350cc and €1 per cc thereafter. There is a reduction depending on the age of the vehicle, from 10% after three months to 100% (completely remitted) for vehicles over 30 years old.

==== Electric and hybrid vehicles ====
Electric vehicles and hybrid vehicles can have a remission or repayment of VRT of up to €2,500 until the end of 2010.

==== VAT ====
VAT is chargeable (on the VRT-inclusive price) on new vehicles (but not tractors) imported unregistered or within six months of registration outside Ireland, or on vehicles with an odometer reading under 6,000 kilometres at import.

==== Penalties ====
A vehicle on which VRT should have been paid but was not is liable to be seized.

=== Non-principal private residence levy ===
The owner of a house other than a principal private residence must pay a charge, as of 2010 €200, per year. The charge for 2009 was payable in September, but in subsequent years, it is payable in March.

The charge applies to "residential properties", which includes a house, maisonette, flat, or apartment, but excludes:

- Buildings which are of scientific, historical, architectural or aesthetic interest and are open to the public, subject to approval of the Minister for Tourism, Culture, Arts, Gaeltacht, Sport and Media and Revenue
- A building which is part of the trading stock of a business and has never been used as a dwelling, nor has any income been derived from it
- A building let by a minister of the government, a housing authority, or the HSE
- A building let by a body approved by a housing authority
- A building let to a housing authority, or to the HSE
- A building subject to commercial rates

Additionally, the following persons are exempt from paying the charge in respect of the building or buildings in question:

- A person occupying a building as his sole or main residence (which includes a person who so occupies part of a building and claims rent-a-room relief on the remainder)
- A charity or a discretionary trust
- A divorced or separated person whose former spouse lives in the building
- An incapacitated person living in a place which he does not own (e.g. a nursing home)
- A person who allows a relative to reside, free of rent, in a building within 2 kilometres of his own residence (vernacularly called a "granny flat")

If the charge is unpaid, it has the effect of a charge in favour of the local council against the property.

A person who moves house is not liable to the charge in respect of either of the houses that year.

== Motor tax ==
Motor tax, payable to the local council where the owner lives, arises when a car or other motor vehicle is used on a public road. A circular receipt, known colloquially as a tax disc, is issued on payment and must be displayed in the front of the vehicle. Certain vehicles, including state-owned vehicles, fire engines, and vehicles for disabled drivers are exempt from motor tax.

Motor tax may be paid for three, six, or 12 months, although paying annually is cheaper. It can be paid online; verification of insurance details is required to get a tax disc.

The tax for private cars first registered from July 2008 is calculated on the basis of carbon dioxide emissions; for cars registered before that, the rate depends on engine displacement. Goods vehicle tax rates are determined based on gross vehicle weight, the tax for buses is based on the number of seats, and flat rates apply to other types of vehicles.

== Taxation evasion and tax avoidance ==
Tax evasion is common in Ireland. Audits conducted in 2025 resulted in an extra €591m in taxes.

Tax avoidance is a legal process where one's financial affairs are arranged so as to legitimately pay less tax. In some cases the Revenue will pursue individuals or companies who avail of tax avoidance; however their success here is limited because tax avoidance is entirely legal.

The areas where tax evasion can still be found are businesses that deal in a lot of cash. The trades, small businesses, etc., will sell goods and perform services while accepting cash for the good/service. The buyer will avoid paying VAT at 21% and the seller does not declare the monies for Income Tax. Revenue perform random audits on businesses to discourage and punish this. Businesses are regularly taken to court for tax evasion. Revenue claim a business will be audited roughly every seven years.

Other methods have also been employed by government to combat tax evasion. For example, the introduction of a Taxi Regulator and subsequent regulations for the taxi industry has meant that the opportunities for taxi drivers to avoid declaring cash income have dwindled. By law, taxi drivers must now issue an electronic receipt for each fare, effectively recording their income.

=== List of tax defaulters ===
Since 1983, the Revenue Commissioners have published a quarterly list of tax defaulters. The list includes the name, address and settlement details for every case where a settlement exceeded €50,000, and where the taxpayer did not meet other criteria such as making a qualifying disclosure.

In April 2023, The Irish Times reported that the Revenue Commissioners were examining the implications for the list of a ruling by the European Court of Human Rights. In the case of Case OF L.B. v. Hungary (Application no. 36345/16), the grand jury of the court (led by Irish judge Síofra O'Leary) ruled that publication of L.B.'s default and of his personal details was a breach of his right to privacy under Article 8 of the European Convention on Human Rights. The court ruled that "this public shaming list was a modern form of pillory, was extremely humiliating and caused huge distress", because Hungary had failed to apply five test of balance. The Tánaiste Micheál Martin said that the finding would have to be studied in detail.

== Local taxes ==
Prior to 1977, all property owners in Ireland had to pay "rates" – based on the "rateable valuation" of the property – to the local council. Rates were used by local authorities to provide services such as mains water and refuse collection. Rates for private residences were abolished in 1977, with national taxes increased and local authorities instead receiving funding from central government. Rates continue in operation for commercial property.

In recent years, the government has introduced new local taxes. A charge for water was to be introduced in 2014 but this was cancelled after widespread opposition including Right2Water Ireland. A bin tax, for domestic refuse collection, was introduced in the last 15 years, and domestic refuse collection, previously carried out by local councils, was privatised. Opponents claim that the charges are double-taxation – that in the aftermath of the abolition of domestic rates in 1977, their taxes were increased to fund local authorities. However, with the ever-rising cost of providing these services, council funding is no longer sufficient to cover costs and user charges would free up council budgets for more worthwhile projects.

Motor tax is paid into the Local Government Fund and is distributed among local authorities.

== See also ==
- Economy of the Republic of Ireland
- Personal Public Service Number (PPSN)
- Modified gross national income GNI* replacement for GDP

== Sources ==
- PricewaterhouseCoopers Ireland (2018), Tax Facts 2018
