= Irish Section 110 Special Purpose Vehicle =

Irish zero-tax legal structure

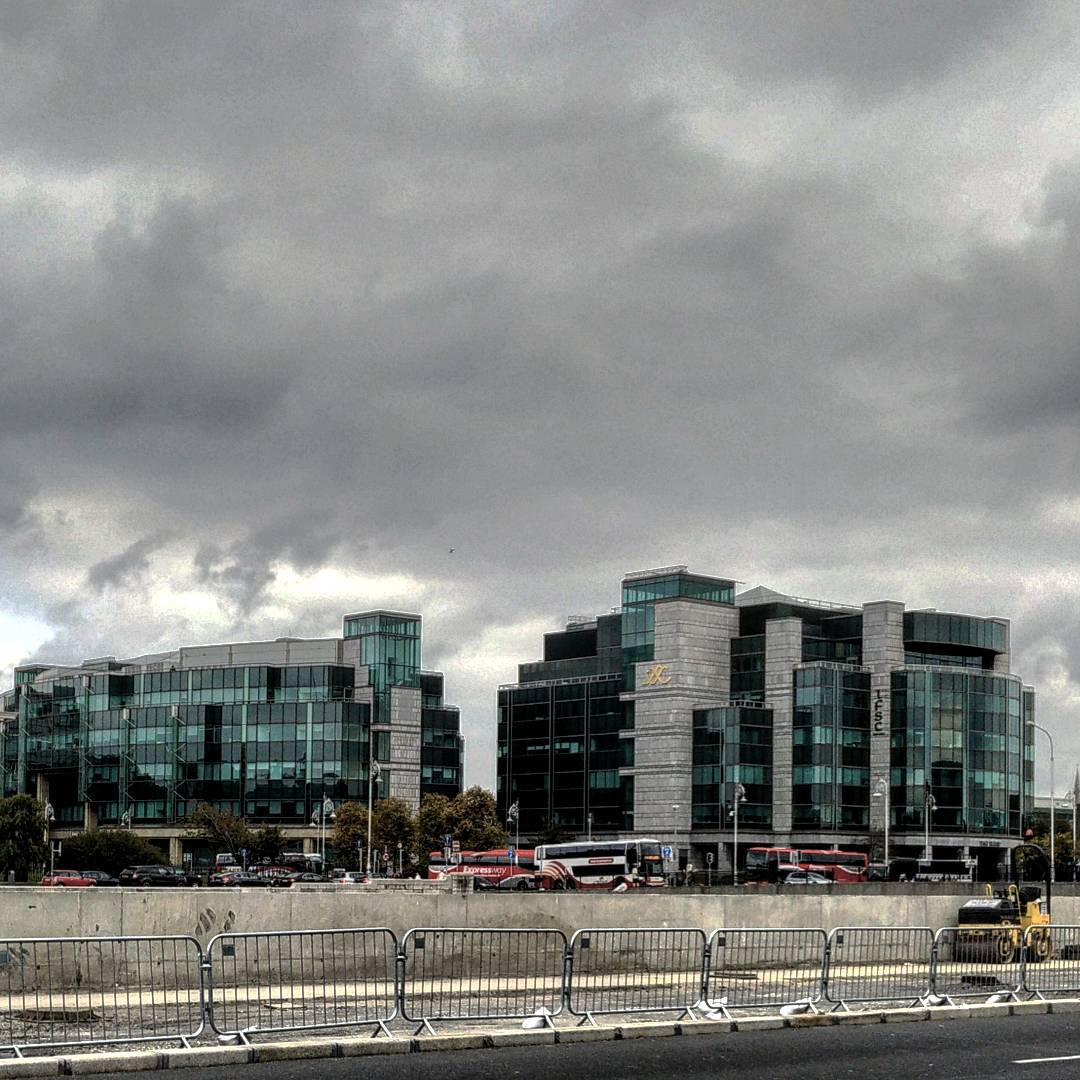
International Financial Services Centre. Section 110 SPVs were created in 1997 to allow IFSC law firms administer securitisation business; in 2012 these firms would use the SPVs to assist U.S. distressed debt funds shelter over €40 billion of Irish investments (€80 billion in loan balances) from Irish tax.

An Irish Section 110 special purpose vehicle (SPV) or section 110 company is an Irish tax resident company, which qualifies under Section 110 of the Taxes Consolidation Act 1997 (TCA) for a special tax regime that enables the SPV to attain "tax neutrality": i.e., the SPV pays no Irish taxes, VAT, or duties.

Section 110 was enacted in 1997 to help International Financial Services Centre (IFSC) legal and accounting firms compete for the administration of global securitisation deals, and by 2017 was the largest structured finance vehicle in EU securitisation. Section 110 SPVs have made the IFSC the third largest global Shadow Banking OFC. While they pay no Irish tax, they contribute €100 million annually to the Irish economy in fees paid to IFSC legal and accounting firms.

In June 2016, it was discovered that US distressed debt funds used Section 110 SPVs, structured by IFSC service firms, to avoid Irish taxes on €80 billion of Irish domestic investments. The cost to the Irish exchequer has been material. Despite the scale of the avoidance, the Revenue Commissioners attempted no investigation or prosecution. The government's response to the scandal in 2016–2017 was unusual, closing some loopholes but leaving others open, including a five-year capital gains tax (CGT) exemption to aid alternative restructuring. The affair is a source of dispute.

The abuses were discovered because Section 110 SPVs file public accounts with the Irish CRO. In 2018, the Central Bank of Ireland upgraded the L–QIAIF, to give the same tax-free structure on Irish assets held via debt as the Section 110 SPV, but without having to file public accounts with the Irish CRO.

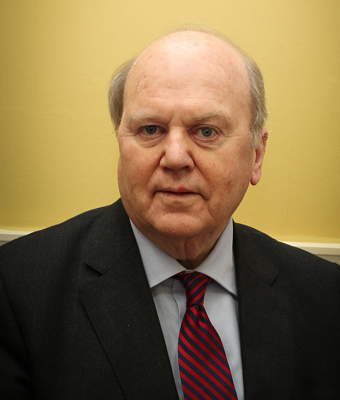
Finance Minister Michael Noonan moved to partially close some of the abuses of Section 110 SPVs by U.S. distressed debt funds in the Irish domestic economy in the Finance Act 2016, but decided against full closure, or any investigation or Revenue Commissioners sanction.

Academic research in 2016–2018 showed IFSC Section 110 SPVs are largely unregulated, operating like brass plate companies with low supervision from the Revenue or the Central Bank of Ireland. It showed Section 110 SPVs were used by sanctioned/prohibited Russian banks. A June 2017 study published in Nature listed Ireland as one of the global Conduit OFCs which use SPVs to route funds to tax havens. In March 2018, the Financial Stability Forum showed SPVs had made Ireland the 3rd largest Shadow Banking OFC. In June 2018, tax academics showed Ireland was the world's largest tax haven.

== Creation ==
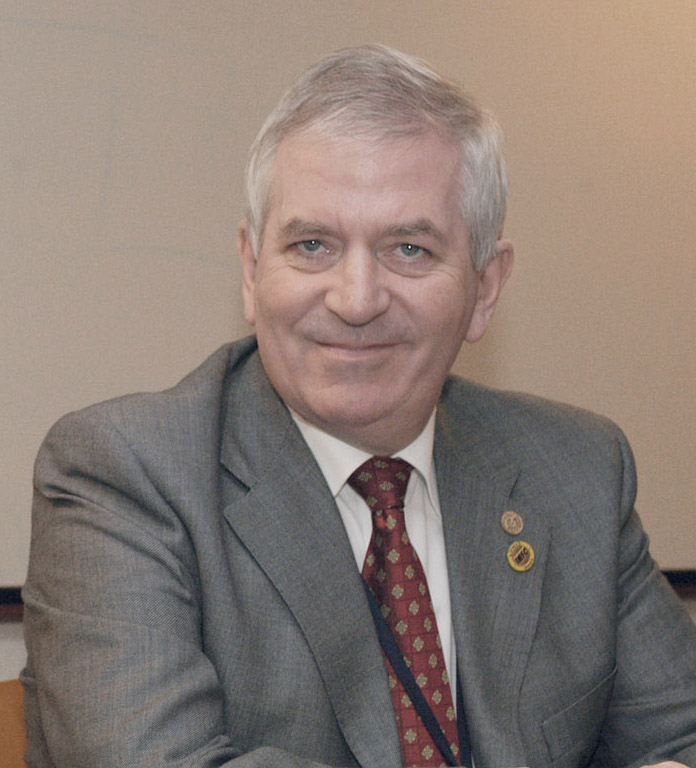
Minister Charlie McCreevy's landmark 1997 Tax and Consolidation Act created Section 110 SPVs and laid the foundations for Ireland's leading corporate BEPS tools.

While Ireland had created securitisation SPVs from 1991 onwards for their emerging International Financial Services Centre (IFSC), Section 110 of the 1997 Taxes and Consolidation Act (TCA) introduced more advanced SPVs to enable the IFSC complete in the global securitisation market.

The new Section 110 SPV was fully tax neutral (also known as tax transparent), which meant that with appropriate financial structuring, no Irish taxes (including Irish income taxes, capital gains taxes, withholding taxes or even Irish VAT and Irish stamp duty) would apply inside the new Irish Section 110 SPV.

Full tax neutrality was available as standard in the offshore financial centres who already had zero domestic taxes (i.e. Bermuda, the Cayman). As tax havens however, their reputation, and a restricted network of global tax treaties, made then less acceptable to the banks who originate securitisation SPVs.

Onshore competitors, like Luxembourg and the Netherlands, used a civil law legal system, also less favored by securitisation originators

Irish companies had access to the EU's network of tax treaties in a preferred common law legal system. However, offering Irish companies as vehicles for tax neutral securitisations brought risks to the tax base of the Irish economy as Irish domestic assets and businesses could be repackaged into Section 110 "qualifying assets".

Explicit solutions (i.e. the SPV could not hold Irish assets) were ruled out as the Section 110 SPV could be challenged as a non-ordinary Irish company, losing tax treaty access. Instead, controls were introduced that, while less explicit, would collectively ensure Section 110 SPVs were confined to global securitisation:

1. Section 110 SPVs were limited to entities licensed to operate within the IFSC (in 1997, the IFSC was an 11–hectare site in Dublin).
2. Irish Revenue had to be notified on the creation of each individual Section 110 SPV (and could challenge any it found unacceptable).
3. Existing Irish anti-avoidance tax rules would apply (e.g. withholding tax rules would prevent domestic profits leaving Ireland, untaxed).

While IFSC law firms lobbied for the removal of i. & iii. (above), and exemptions from improvements in Irish company law, these controls seemed to work. There is no record of any entity (Irish or foreign) using Section 110 SPVs to avoid Irish tax on Irish domestic investments or businesses until c. 2012 (§ Abuses).

Note, Irish banks use Section 110 SPVs to raise capital to finance their Irish mortgage books in the global capital markets (they all have IFSC offices). However, as the source Irish borrower pays loan interest to the Irish bank, who then incurs Irish taxes inside their Irish-taxed corporate bank structure, there is no loss of Irish taxes to the Irish exchequer.

In contrast, if Irish borrowers paid loan interest into a Section 110 SPV, no Irish taxes are ever paid, causing a permanent loss to the exchequer. Irish anti-avoidance rules (iii. above), would kick-in and apply Irish withholding taxes of 20% in such situations, but the Revenue Commissioners would controversially set these anti-avoidance rules aside in 2016 (§ Abuses).

== Features ==
=== Qualifying company ===
For Irish Section 110 SPVs to be accepted under EU tax treaties (and be OECD-whitelisted), they must to be ordinary Irish resident companies, in Irish and EU Company Law.

In this regard, more advanced and/or aggressive Irish tax-neutral vehicles, which are fully tax-free and can be operated in greater secrecy from public views, such as the Qualifying investor alternative investment fund (QIAIF), or LQIAIFs and QIFs, were not deemed suitable for the global securitisation transaction marketplace.

As an ordinary Irish company, a Section 110 SPV usually takes one of 3 main forms:

- private limited company (LTD);
- public limited company (PLC); and
- designated activity company (DAC) (essentially a private limited company (LTD), but who can also use listed debt (but not equity) securities).

A "qualifying company" under Section 110 of the 1997 TCA means a company which:

1. is resident in Ireland and files accounts (i.e. is a normal Irish Company)
2. acquires "qualifying assets" (see list below)
3. carries on in Ireland the business of the holding and/or management of "qualifying assets" (i.e. is not a "brass plate")
4. apart from activities ancillary to that business carries on no other activities
5. undertakes the first transaction for a value of not less than €10m
6. notifies the Irish tax authorities that it is a company to which points (a) to (e) apply

=== Qualifying assets ===
The list of "qualifying assets" which can be held inside an Irish Section 110 SPV is large (it has been extended with subsequent Finance Acts).

It goes well beyond the original classic securitisation categories and currently includes:

1. Shares, bonds and other securities
2. Futures, options, swaps, derivatives and similar instruments
3. Invoices and all types of receivables
4. Obligations evidencing debt (including loans and deposits)
5. Leases and loan and lease portfolios
6. Hire purchase contracts
7. Acceptance credits and all other documents of title relating to the movement of goods
8. Bills of exchange, commercial paper, promissory notes and all other kinds of negotiable or transferable instruments
9. Certain types of carbon offsets
10. Contracts for insurance and contracts for reinsurance
11. Commodities (i.e. tangible assets dealt in on a recognised commodity exchange)
12. Plant and machinery

=== Structural elements ===
There are three key elements relevant to structuring Irish Section 110 SPVs (as discussed in attached references):

These structuring elements are also discussed in more detail in the briefing notes issues by the Revenue Commissioners on Section 110 SPVs.

==== Orphan structure ====
In common with most securitisation vehicles, Irish Section 110 SPVs use an orphan structure in which the equity is held by an unconnected third party who has no effective rights or controls on the SPV. Irish registered charitable trusts were a common choice (some Irish law firms went so far as to create their own in-house registered charities). However, a public scandal in 2016 regarding use of Irish Section 110 SPVs in domestic Irish tax avoidance (see § Abuses) led to a ruling by the Irish Charity Regulator prohibiting Irish registered charities from owning equity in Section 110 SPVs. Orphaning is a potentially strong tax avoidance tool as it allows equity to be restructured into tax-free debt (see § Participation notes), and the Revenue Commissioners reserve the right to challenge cases created for tax avoidance, although they have never done so in practice.

==== Participation notes ====
The TCA 1997 legislation includes a headline tax rate of 25% on non-trading income so that the SPV is regarded as an Irish taxable entity. Thus, the Section 110 SPV is not presented overtly as a tax-free vehicle (i.e. unlike an Irish QIAIF), which would attract adverse attention from other tax authorities (under tax treaty rules), or regulators (e.g. EU or OECD).

To get to a zero-tax position, the TCA 1997 allows "Profit Participation Notes" (PPNs). These are artificial internal loans to the SPV, whose rate of interest can be sufficiently variable to absorb all income/gains generated in the SPV. As an Irish trading company, the SPV can charge loan interest as an expense (deductible against Irish tax), rather than a deemed profit distribution (not deductible against Irish tax).

PPNs are often domiciled in a tax haven (a dutch sandwich may be needed to avoid Irish withholding tax transferring the PPN interest payments to the tax haven). PPNs are often sought to be classed as "Eurobonds" in the Irish tax legislation which gives them additional tax robustness, and also allows the PPN to be integrated with the Irish QIAIF regime, also tax-free, and held in a more stable corporate tax haven such as Luxembourg. Where the PPNs fail to achieve "Eurobond" classification, the PPNs can be owned by an Irish QIAIF, who will then issue qualifying "Eurobonds" from a sink ofc jurisdiction.

While the various Finance Acts strengthened the rules on PPNs (the 2016 Finance Act mentions a "market rate" of interest and that structures should be created on an "arms length" bases), the effective rules, and the list of exemptions and exempted parties, allow considerable freedom in structuring PPNs to sweep up all income generated by the "qualifying assets" in the SPV (via PPN interest payments). Irish professional services firms, who lead the drafting of Irish tax legislation, can provide the corporate finance services needed to produce evidence satisfying the "market rate" and "arms length" tests.

As Ireland has no thin capitalisation rules, the Section 110 SPV can be 100% financed by PPN debt, making the SPV a fully tax-free vehicle (i.e. no equity leakage).

==== Tax residence ====
To qualify as an Irish resident company the Section 110 SPV needs to meet minimum tests from the Revenue Commissioners to demonstrate that the SPV is (a) incorporated in Ireland and (b) "managed and controlled" from Ireland. The orphaning process will ensure the relevant trust that "owns" the SPV equity is Irish domiciled, thus satisfying the incorporation test. The "managed and controlled" test is vaguer (based on UK case law) but typically results in the SPV requiring two Irish resident directors, a registered Irish office, an Irish-based administrator, and that the key Board meetings are held in Ireland.

=== Approval process ===
There is no process for approving the creation of a Section 110 SPV. Luxembourg Leaks showed pre-approving vehicles, risks challenges under EU State aid rules, resulting in sanctions and fines. The entire economic benefit of the SPV sector to Ireland (of which Section 110 is a subset) is only circa €100m in annual fees paid to Irish professional services firms (SPVs pay no Irish taxes).

Irish Revenue Commissioners reserve the right to challenge existing Irish Section 110 SPVs under the general Irish anti-avoidance legislation. However, as since the creation of Section 110 SPVs in 1997, no case has ever been brought by the Revenue Commissioners against an Irish Section 110 SPV. Up until 2017, no audit even has ever been undertaken by the Revenue Commissioners into the activities of an Irish Section 110 SPV.

The Section 110 SPV is therefore set up and a notice sent to the Revenue Commissioners declaring the intention of the Directors to file under Section 110 of the 1997 TCA. Before 2010, there was no obligation on the Revenue Commissioners to acknowledge this notice was received, however, this has recently been formalised to an 8–week notice period. The IDSA is lobbying for a 24–hour "online" approval system (as per the QIAIFs).

== Evolution ==
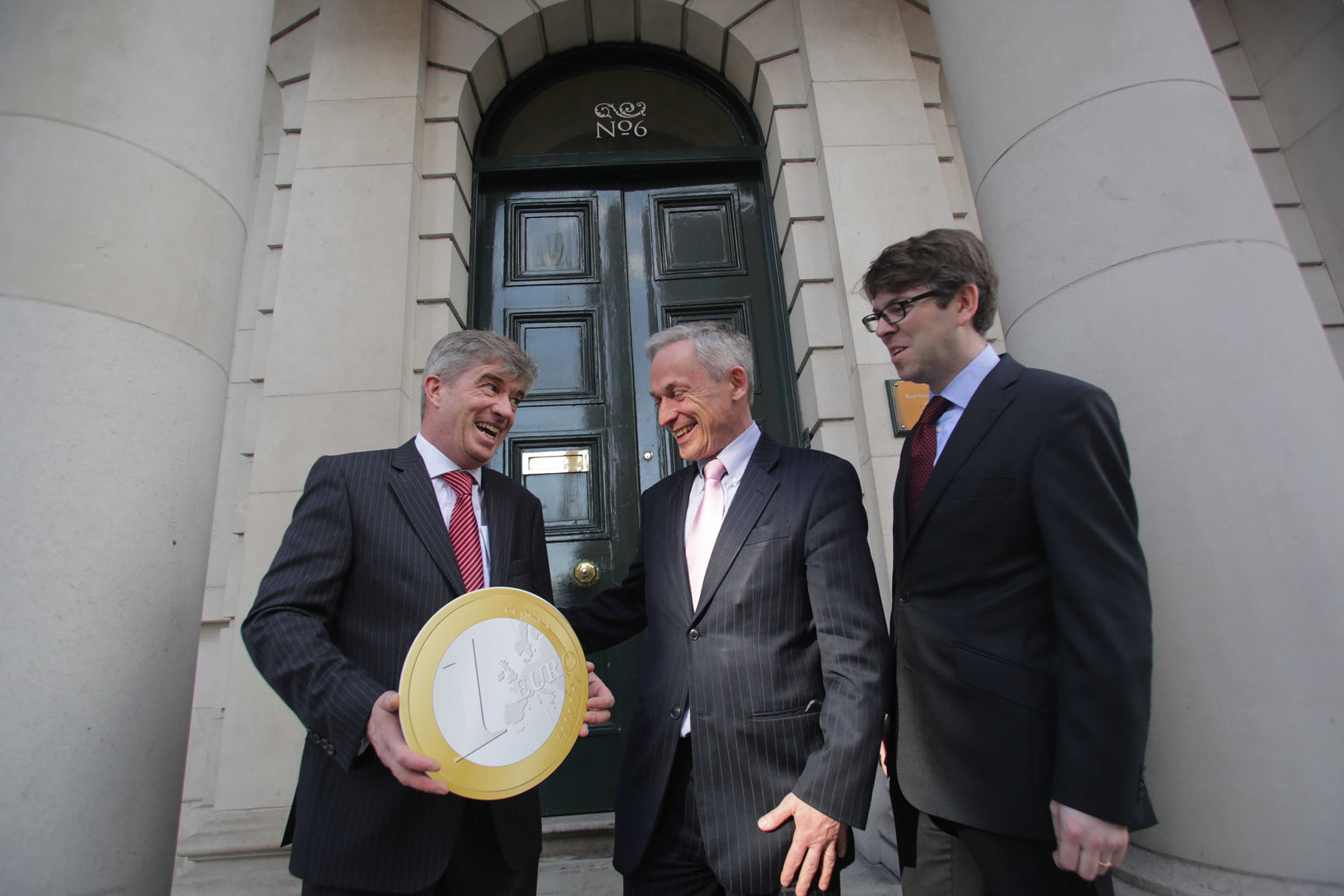
Irish Debt Securities Association (IDSA) launch in 2013 with Minister Richard Bruton, IDSA CEO Gary Palmer, and IDSA Chairman Turlough Galvin of Matheson's Tax Practice.

By 2017, the Irish Section 110 SPV was the most popular securitisation SPV in the EU. In addition, the Irish Section 110 SPV expanded its adoption and use far beyond the original securitisation market to make the IFSC the 3rd largest Shadow Banking OFC in the world. While SPVs pay no Irish tax, the generate circa €100m annually for the Irish economy in fees paid to law firms.

IFSC law firms successfully lobbied in the 2003 and 2005 Finance Acts for the withholding tax rules to be relaxed for Section 110 SPVs (and especially for Eurobond financing). They argued the Revenue Commissioners could still challenge any Section 110 SPV deemed unfit (ii. § Creation), and that the withholding tax rules put the IFSC at a disadvantage versus Luxembourg.

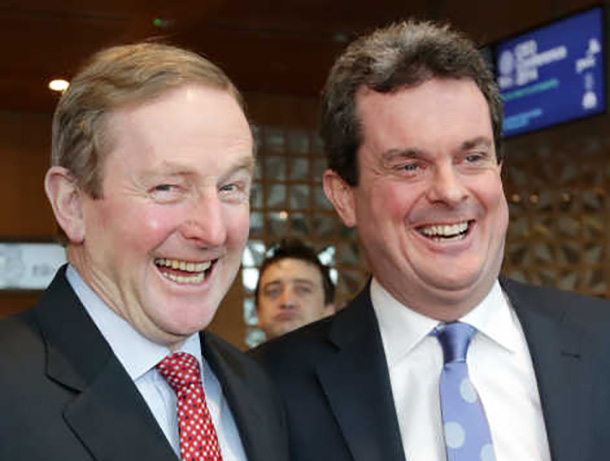
Irish Taoiseach Enda Kenny and PwC (Ireland) Managing Partner Feargal O'Rourke

Successive Finance Acts (2003, 2008, 2011 and 2016) extended the list of "qualifying assets" beyond the classic categories that make up the bulk of the global securitisation market. According to IDSA (Irish Debt Securities Association, the Section 110 SPV lobby group created by IFSC tax-law firm, Matheson in 2013), the only asset which Irish Section 110 SPVs cannot invest in is direct Irish or non-Irish property (Ireland has REITs for this).

Section 110 SPV legislation has been refined around the treatment of PPNs so they are acceptable to the widest tax treaty network. The focus has been around tightening the language around "arm's length" or "market tested" rates of PPN interest. However the rules remain sufficiently broad, and the exclusions sufficiently general, to materially limit the effect of these changes. A particular aim is enabling the PPN's to be classed as "Eurobonds" so they can be legally domiciled in Luxembourg, which has become a key "backdoor" out of the Irish corporate tax regime into a full Sink OFC.

To protect the PPNs from the Generally Accepted Accounting Principles (GAAP), and International Financial Reporting Standards (IFRS), which target instruments like PPNs, the Irish Government allows Section 110 SPVs to file accounts under old Irish GAAP (GAAP 2004). In addition the 2010 Transfer Pricing rules do not apply to Section 110 SPVs.

Irish professional services have developed ways to link Irish Section 110 SPVs with Irish QIAIFs (or QIFs) to create an Orphaned Super–QIAIF. This vehicle combines the secrecy of the Irish QIAIF structures (unlike SPVs, QIAIFs don't file Irish public accounts), with the tax neutrality and global acceptability of the Irish Section 110 SPV. Using a QIAIF to "own" the Section 110 PPNs, which can be "back-to-backed" with newly issued "eurobonds" from the QIAIF, is an established "backdoor" out of the Irish tax system to Luxembourg, the main Sink OFC for Ireland.

Abuses of Section 110 SPVs in the Irish domestic market (see below), led Finance Minister Michael Noonan to make changes in light of ".. use of aggressive tax practices by some Section 110 companies to avoid paying tax..." The new rules are complex but prohibit Section 110 SPVs from holding direct Irish property and tighten the Irish Revenue notification process to 8 weeks. (§ Abuses)

The abuses highlighted that the Central Bank of Ireland provides little effective regulation on Section 110 SPVs, however, they were only uncovered because the Section 110 SPV must file public accounts with the Irish CRO. In late 2016 the Central Bank of Ireland began a consultation process to upgrade the little-used L–QIAIF regime. In February 2018, the Central Bank of Ireland changed its AIF "Rulebook" to allow L–QIAIFs hold the same assets that Section 110 SPVs could own. However, the upgraded L–QIAIFs offered two specific improvements over the Section 110 SPV:

1. Tax secrecy. L–QIAIFs do not file public accounts (how Section 110 SPV tax abuses were uncovered), but send confidential reports to the Central Bank, who will not screen for tax avoidance;
2. No need for Profit Participating Notes (PPN). A weakness of Section 110 SPVs is their reliance on artificial PPNs for the BEPS movement. L–QIAIFs do not need PPNs.

Three months after the Irish Central Bank updated its AIF "Rulebook", the Irish Revenue Commissioners issued new guidance in May 2018 on Section 110 SPV taxation which would further reduce their attractiveness as a mechanism to avoid Irish taxes on Irish assets. In June 2018, the Central Bank of Ireland reported that €55 billion of U.S.-owned distressed Irish assets, equivalent to 25% of Irish GNI*, moved out of Section 110 SPVs and into L-QIAIFs. The L–QIAIF, and the ICAV wrapper, is expected to take over as the main structure for avoiding Irish tax on Irish assets in a confidential manner.

== Abuses ==
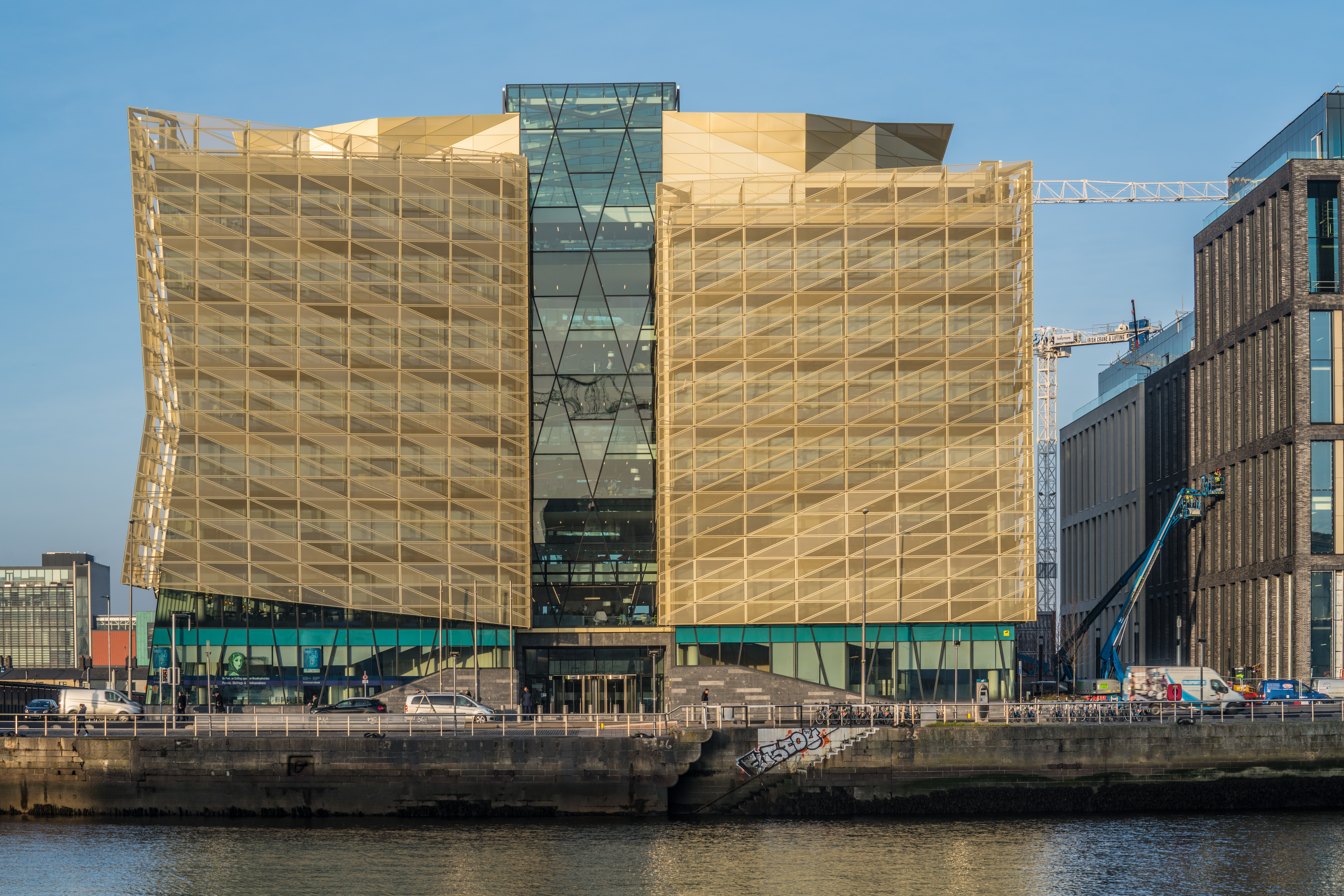
Central Bank of Ireland (CBI) regulates Section 110 SPVs. When Irish public scandals concerning the Section 110 SPV emerged in 2016–2017, the CBI upgraded the little-used L–QIAIF, to give the same benefits as Section 110 SPVs, but with full confidentiality and tax secrecy.

The abuses below were uncovered because Section 110 SPVs have to file public accounts with the Irish CRO. The Central Bank of Ireland has addressed this aspect of Section 110 SPVs by upgrading the little used L–QIAIF regime in February 2018 to give the same tax-free structure to hold Irish assets via debt instruments, but in a confidential structure (discussed further in Ireland as a tax haven).

=== Vulture fund tax avoidance ===
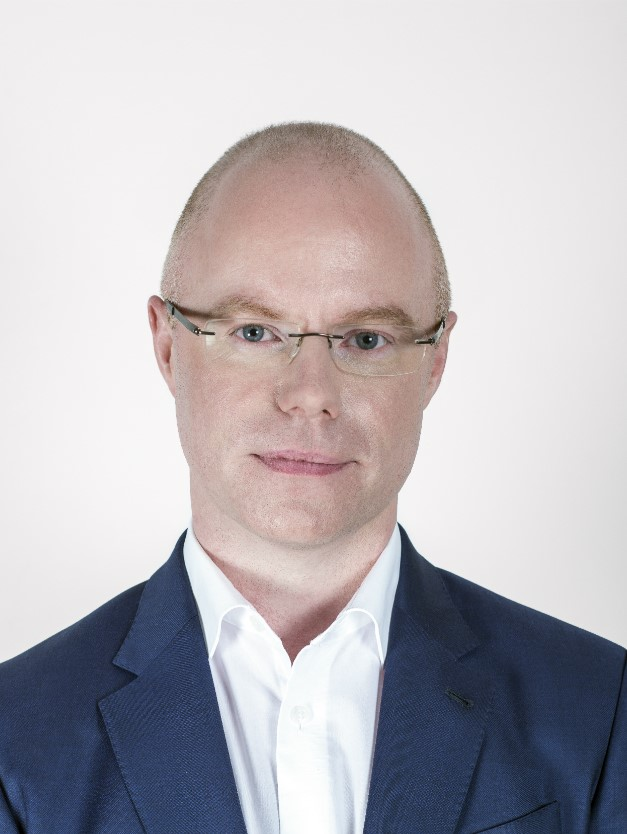
Stephen Donnelly TD. Estimated US distressed funds would avoid €20 billion in Irish taxes from 2016 to 2026 on circa €40 billion of Irish investments made from 2012 to 2016 (which represented circa €80 billion in headline Irish loan balances).

From the 1997 TCA to the Irish crisis in 2009, there is no known case of a Section 110 SPV being used to avoid Irish domestic taxes on Irish assets or businesses. They were confined to global finance as was intended. Per earlier (§ Creation), while Irish banks used Section 110 SPVs to raise global capital for Irish loan books, they never used Section 110 SPVs to avoid Irish taxes on their Irish activities (the Irish borrower paid interest to the Irish bank, and not into a Section 110 SPV).

The Irish financial media noted in 2016 that US distressed debt funds (known by the pejorative term–vulture funds) were filing Irish company CRO accounts with large profits on their Irish investments (made from 2012 onwards), but no Irish tax payments. They could also see that the equity of these companies was "owned" by Irish-registered charities (children's charities in cases), some of which were operated by IFSC-based law firms.

The CRO filings showed these vulture funds were using orphaned Section 110 SPVs, structured by IFSC–based law firms (e.g. Matheson, A&L Goodbody and Dillon Eustace and Mayson Hayes Curran), who use Section 110 SPVs in securitisation work, to export untaxed income and capital gains earned on domestic Irish assets to offshore locations (via the PPN interest payments), such as the Cayman Islands.

Funds using the Section 110 SPVs included the largest names in distressed investing, including:

1. Oaktree Capital Management, known through their Mars Capital (and others) Section 110 SPVs, and advised by IFSC law firm, Matheson.
2. Cerberus Capital Management, known through their Promonotoria series of Section 110 SPVs, and advised by IFSC law firm, A&L Goodbody.
3. Apollo Global Management, known through their Tanager series of Section 110 SPVs, and advised by IFSC law firm, A&L Goodbody.
4. Lone Star Funds, known through their LSREF series of Section 110 SPVs, and advised by IFSC law firm, Dillon Eustace.
5. Carval Investors, known through a diverse series of Section 110 SPVs (including Stapleford, Vanguard), and advised by IFSC law firm, Matheson.
6. Goldman Sachs, known through the "Irish named" Section 110 SPVs (Belthany, Kenmane, Liffey etc.), advised by IFSC law firm, Matheson.

Mezzanine capital lenders were also using Section 110 SPVs to avoid taxes but in addition, by restructuring the equity of their clients into Section 110 "qualifying loans", they helped their Irish borrowers reduce Irish domestic corporation tax. The State's Irish Strategic Investment Fund was a co-investor in these firms (e.g. BlueBay Capital, Cardinal Capital).

It emerged that the regulator of Section 110 SPVs, the Central Bank of Ireland, was paying rent to a US vulture fund landlord, that had structured their investment to avoid all Irish taxes, and stamp duty, on the rent.

The Irish media uncovered that the National Asset Management Agency, presented to distressed debt funds in London on how to use Section 110 SPVs (and QIAIFs) to avoid Irish taxes on their Irish investments.

Public statements, Guideline Bulletins, and FOI Data, from the Revenue Commissioners, implied that the Revenue Commissioners (a) knew these funds were using Section 110 SPVs in the domestic Irish market, and (b) that the Revenue Commissioners were prepared to issue rulings to amend their own anti-avoidance rules (esp. withholding tax rules and CG50 land certificates) to facilitate the tax avoidance.

This is a relatively new situation that has arisen and we are working to resolve it ... Up to recently, these loans would have normally been held by [Irish] banks and so that was no issue about deducting [Irish withholding tax] from interest. But this has changed, so we're looking at coming up with a broad solution. I would say that there is no need for panic as there is a long-established procedure in place in the legislation and the only issue is to establish whether the SPV a company is paying to is a Section 110 company.

— Gerry Howard, Assistant Secretary Revenue Commissioners, 26 March 2016 (Irish Times)

Stephen Donnelly, TD, called for a Dáil investigation and produced calculations based on the €80 billion of published loan balances sold by the National Asset Management Agency (or "NAMA") to the US funds for circa €40 billion. Donnelly estimated that the loss of Irish taxes over the next decade from these assets being taken out of the Irish tax system (i.e. base erosion and profit shifting effects), could reach €20 billion (or €2 billion per annum). The Irish Times calculated the total economic contribution of Section 110 SPVs since their creation, would be vastly exceeded by these tax losses.

The affair escalated into a major public scandal during 2016, and was covered as such in the international media, and in several Irish RTÉ Prime Time Investigates programs.

The Irish Government claimed that the U.S. funds had discovered unknown but legitimate loopholes, which they moved to close in the 2016 Finance Act. The Government budgeted €50 million in total additional taxes from the closure of these loopholes, however NAMA, a small investor in Section 110 SPVs, disclosed an immediate €158 million tax charge due to the Act. The slowness of the Government's response in closing these "perceived" loopholes, and the extensive list of exemptions (including a 5-year CGT exemption), and excluded parties to the Act, remains a source of dispute.

Irish Revenue attempted no prosecution for the acknowledged tax-avoidance. Funds could leave Section 110 SPVs in place and continue to earn tax-free gains, as long as they did not foreclose. If they foreclosed, they had a period in which to sell the assets, and hence the 5–year CGT exemption. They could also transfer their Section 110 assets into a more confidential QIAIF (and later, an LQIAIF), also using the 5–year CGT exemption to avoid incurring taxes while restructuring.

The limited response of the government led some Irish commentators to wonder if the vulture funds had their support (i.e. there was no loophole just a "blind eye").

In June 2018, the Central Bank of Ireland reported that €55 billion in Irish assets, owned by U.S. distressed debt funds, equivalent to 25% of Irish GNI*, moved out of Section 110 SPVs. This figure exceeded Stephen Donnelly's 2016 estimate of €40 billion in Irish distressed asset values hiding in Section 110 SPVs (representing €80 billion in loan balances). The Central Bank of Ireland had begun a process to upgrade the tax-free L–QIAIF regime in November 2016 (just after Minister Noonan closed the "perceived" Section 110 loopholes). In February 2018, the Central Bank relaunched the historically little-used L-QIAIF, with the same tax-free features as the Section 110 SPV, but with the distinction that L-QIAIFs do not have to file public CRO accounts. The L–QIAIF is now the main vehicle for U.S. distressed debt funds shielding against Irish tax on their Irish assets.

In March 2019, the UN Special Rapporter on housing, Leilani Farha, formally wrote to the Irish Government on behalf of the UN, regarding its concerns regarding "preferential tax laws" for foreign investment funds on Irish assets which were compromising the human rights of tenants in Ireland. In April 2019, Irish technology entrepreneur Paddy Cosgrave launched a Facebook campaign to highlight abuses of Section 110 SPVs, as well as QIAIFs and L-QIAIFs, stating: "The L-QIAIF runs the risk of being a weapon of mass destruction".

=== Unregulated shadow banking ===
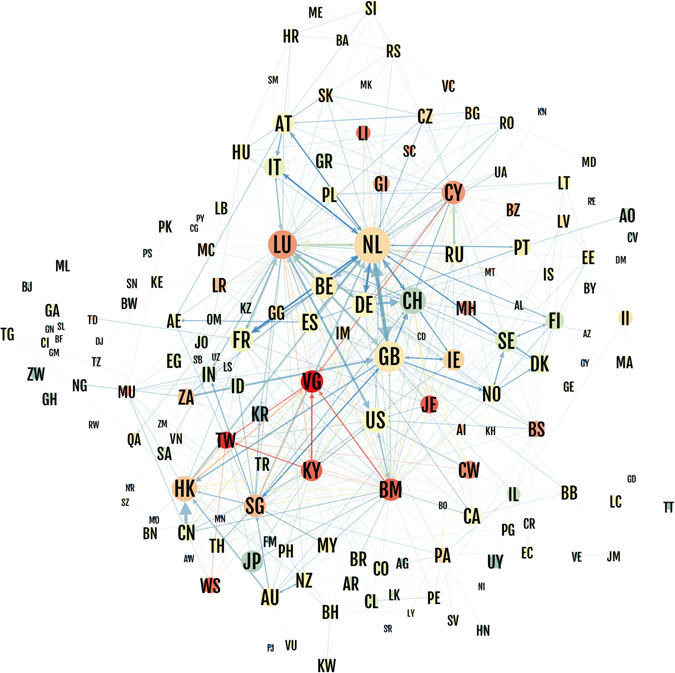
Uncovering OFC Networks. Section 110 SPVs have helped make Ireland the fifth largest global conduit OFC, and one of the largest EU–28 corporate tax havens.

Research by Trinity College Dublin Professor Jim Stewart and Cillian Doyle show Section 110 SPVs are effectively unregulated and attract little oversight by the Revenue Commissioners or Central Bank. Even post the 2016 Finance Act (§ Vulture fund tax avoidance), the data asked for could not be used to assess the provenance of an Irish Section 110 SPV, or its source of funds.

Their research in particular noted the following:

1. Irish professional firms market Section 110 SPVs as "unregulated", "tax-free vehicles", "not subject to [financial] services regulation".
2. The PPN interest deduction as an expense is a unique concession in any tax legislation (not available in ordinary company taxation).
3. There is no Section 110 SPV approval process, and notification information is so basic it could not be used to test suitability.
4. Irish Revenue has conducted no investigations or audits into any Irish Section 110 SPVs (since creation in 1997).
5. The Irish Revenue and Central Bank of Ireland barely meet to discuss Irish Section 110 SPVs (despite being joint regulators).
6. The data the Central Bank of Ireland collect on SPVs is limited (and contained inaccuracies and mistakes vs. ECB statistics).

Further research by Stewart and Doyle shows Russian firms funneled €100bn into Irish Section 110 SPVs since 2007. Some of these Russian firms appeared unsuitable from a number of perspectives (i.e. criminal or sanctioned activities). Many SPVs resembled a brass plate type set up - a situation the Irish Government has stated that it is adverse to.

Of particular note in this research was:

1. Some of these Russian firms are the subject of EU/US Sanctions and some had raised capital via Irish Section SPVs post-sanctions.
2. Other Russian firms were tied to the Russian Banking/Shadow Banking sector (which is linked to prohibited / money laundering activities).
3. The Central Bank of Ireland collects no data on the source of financing to the Irish SPVs (critical for money laundering / criminal activities oversight).
4. Domicile of Irish Section 110 SPVs is cosmetic, with a handful of local Irish Corporate services Firms (CSP) "managing" thousands of Irish SPVs.
5. Governance of Irish Section 110 SPVs is also cosmetic, with local Directors in these CSPs acting as Directors for hundreds of SPVs.

Stewart and Doyle's academic papers on Irish Section 110 SPVs highlight the combination of an anonymous (via orphaning), and tax-free (via the Profit Participation Notes), OECD–whitelisted wrapper, in an effectively unregulated environment, which has coincided with Ireland's position as the world's 4th largest Shadow Banking OFC.

The ex-Deputy Governor of the Central Bank of Ireland said the risks of Section 110 SPV abuse are not appreciated by the Irish Government. The IMF noted the same brass plate type regulation of Irish Section 110 SPVs. This was picked up by Oxfam who has listed Ireland as a top corporate tax haven. It has coincided with G20 economy, Brazil, blacklisting Ireland as a tax haven.

A 2017 seminal academic paper published in Nature on global offshore financial centres (OFCs) ("Uncovering Offshore Financial Centers: Conduits and Sinks in the Global Corporate Ownership Network") lists Ireland as one of five key global Conduit OFCs (with the Netherlands, UK, Singapore and Switzerland). The five Conduit-OFCs are the links to 24 Sink OFCs, which comprise the key offshore centres (i.e. the Cayman Islands). The Conduit-OFCs are the hubs which provide the regulatory reputation and the legal and taxation wappers (i.e. Section 110 SPVs) for money to get into, and out of, the Sink OFCs.

== See also ==
- Economy of the Republic of Ireland
- Corporation tax in the Republic of Ireland
- Qualifying investor alternative investment fund (QIAIF)
- Conduit and Sink OFCs
- Matheson (law firm)
- Ireland as a tax haven
