= Qualifying investor alternative investment fund =

Irish zero-tax legal structure

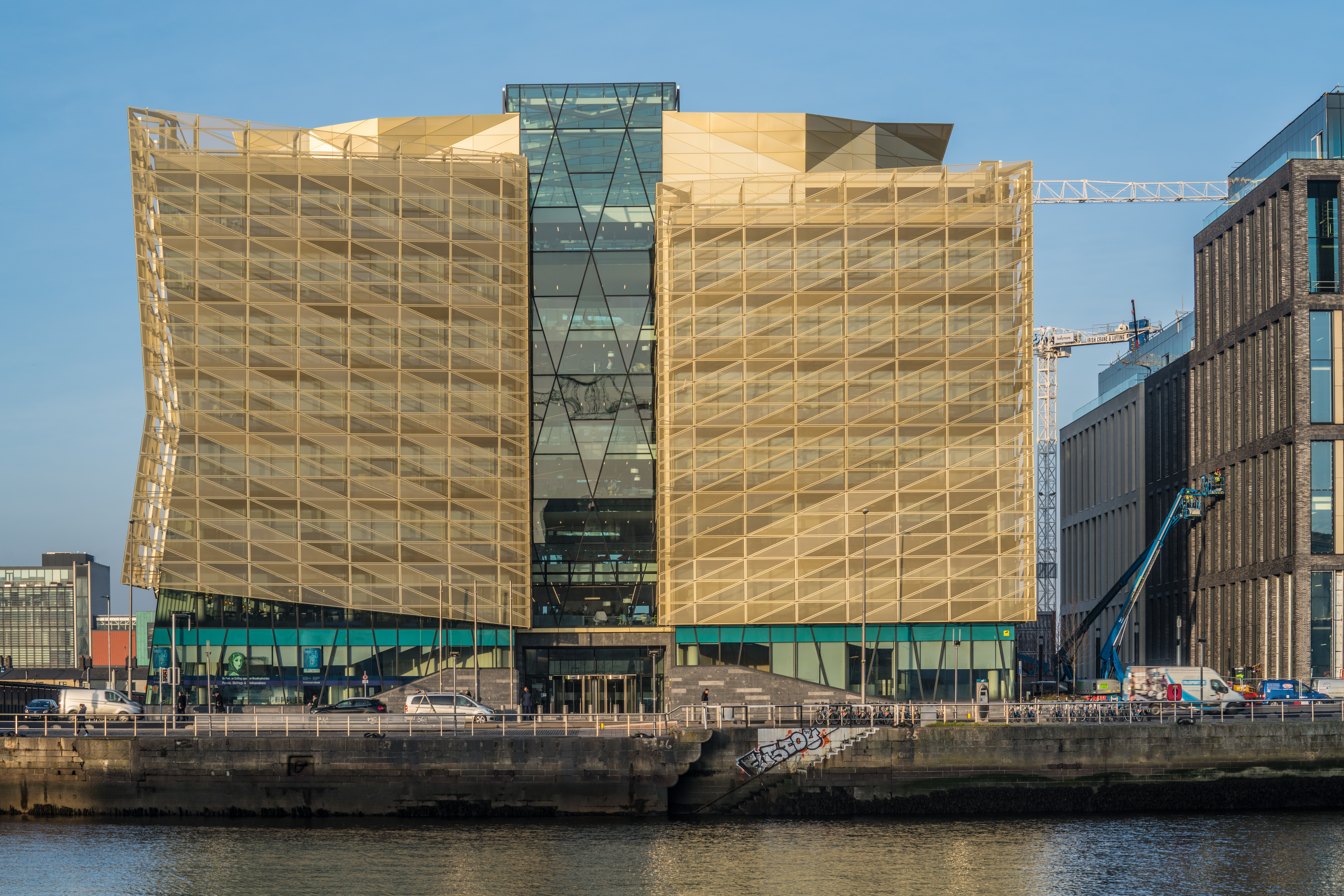
Central Bank of Ireland ("CBI") regulates QIAIFs. When Irish public tax scandals concerning the Section 110 SPV, also regulated by the CBI, emerged in 2016–2017, the CBI upgraded the little-used LQIAIF, to give the same benefits as Section 110 SPVs, but with full confidentiality and tax secrecy.

Qualifying Investor Alternative Investment Fund or QIAIF is a Central Bank of Ireland regulatory classification (Note: The QIAIF is not itself a fund, but a legal and regulatory structure that contains many different type of funds) established in 2013 for Ireland's five tax-free legal structures for holding assets. The Irish Collective Asset-management Vehicle or ICAV is the most popular of the five Irish QIAIF structures, it is the main tax-free structure for foreign investors holding Irish assets.

In 2018, the Central Bank of Ireland expanded the Loan Originating QIAIF or L–QIAIF regime which enables the five tax-free structures to be used for closed-end debt instruments. The L–QIAIF is Ireland's main debt–based BEPS tool as it overcomes the lack of confidentiality and tax secrecy of the Section 110 SPV. (Note: A major tax scandal broke in Ireland in 2016 when it was discovered that U.S. distressed debt funds have used Section 110 SPVs to shield over €80 billion in distressed Irish loan balances from Irish taxation; the scandal was uncovered because Section 110 SPVs have to file Irish public accounts) It is asserted that many assets in QIAIFs and LQIAIFs are Irish assets being shielded from Irish taxation. (Note: As of March 2019, a large proportion of Irish assets and real estate assets are still held via loan securities as a result of the sale of over EUR100 billion in Irish loan balances (sold for cash proceeds of EUR35 billion) by the Irish National Asset Management Agency (NAMA), as well as tens of billions in additional loan balances by other Irish banks, to US distressed debt funds from 2013 to 2019; by reference, 2017 Irish GNI was EUR181 billion. The Irish Real Estate Funds (IREF), which are not tax-free, are largely confined to owners of Irish property via Irish quoted REIT assets.) Irish QIAIFs and LQIAIFs can be integrated with Irish corporate base erosion and profit shifting ("BEPS") tax tools to create confidential routes out of the Irish tax system to Ireland's main Sink OFC, Luxembourg. (Note: Both the IMF, and the Conduit and Sink OFCs study, show that Luxembourg is by far the most popular destination for capital leaving Ireland; The IMF estimates that over half of the capital leaving Ireland goes to Luxembourg.)

In March 2019, the UN identified Ireland's "preferential tax regimes" for foreign funds on Irish assets as affecting the human rights of tenants in Ireland.

== Features ==
Irish QIAIFs are subject to the EU Alternative Investment Fund Managers Directive 2011 ("AIFMD") which lays out detailed rules on the process of constructing (e.g. diversification, leverage), managing (e.g. AIFM approved managers), and marketing (e.g. qualifying investors) of QIAIFs in Europe. However, the following are considered the most important features specific to Irish QIAIFs:

1. Irish domiciled: All of the legal wrappers in the QIAIF regime are Irish domiciled structures and subject to Irish law and Irish tax codes;
2. Tax–free: QIAIFs are exempt from all Irish taxation, including VAT and duties, and can make distributions to non–Irish residents free of any Irish withholding tax;
3. Tax secrecy: Four of the five QIAIF wrappers do not file Irish CRO public accounts, and the reports they file with the Central Bank of Ireland cannot be shared with the Irish Revenue;
4. No restriction on assets: There are no restrictions on the assets the QIAIF can hold;
5. Closed and open-ended options: Irish QIAIFs can be open-ended (e.g. must meet daily liquidity requirements) or closed-ended (e.g. the L–QIAIF);
6. Fast authorisation: The Central Bank runs a "fast track" 24–hour approval process where it doesn't review documents but relies on confirmations from directors and Irish advisors;
7. Light-touch regulation: Irish advisory firms openly market the QIAIF regulatory regime as "light-touch", which has been confirmed from other sources.

As at 2016, €435 billion in alternative assets were held in Irish QIAIFs. Ireland is the fourth-largest domicile for Alternative Investment Funds ("AIF") in the EU with 9.9% of the €4.4 trillion EU AIF market, behind Germany (31.7%), France (21.3%) and Luxembourg (13%). It is asserted that a material amount of QIAIF assets (or AIF assets) are Irish assets being shielded from Irish taxation.

== ICAV ==
Each of the five QIAIF legal wrappers have attributes designed for different uses. However, outside of entities that need the specific attributes of a trust law (and will use the Unit Trust QIAIF), or can only use a full company structure (and will use a VCC QIAIF), the ICAV is expected to be the dominant QIAIF wrapper.

- ICAV (or Irish Collective Asset-management Vehicle). Launched in 2014 for U.S. investors to avoid both U.S. tax and Irish tax on Irish investments; ICAVs became the most popular Irish structure for avoiding Irish taxes on Irish assets; ICAVs meet the U.S. "check-the-box" entity criteria (i.e. the ICAV is shielded from U.S. tax); ICAV filings are confidential to the Central Bank (e.g. no public CRO filings; ICAV governance rules are the weakest of all wrappers and having their own legal identity exempts them from some aspects Irish and EU company law; ICAVs are shown to be superior tax avoidance wrappers to the Cayman Island SPCs, and there are provisions to migrate from Cayman/BVI wrappers; most new Irish QIAIFs are structured as ICAVs.
- Variable Capital Company ("VCC") (or Investment Company or PLC). An Irish company subject to Irish and EU company law; must have asset diversification; cannot "check-the-box" for U.S. investors (which makes it ineffective for U.S. investors holding Irish assets compared to an ICAV); requires substantive governance procedures and reporting requirements; required to file public CRO accounts (and can be scrutinised by the Irish financial media); the VCC is less popular since the introduction of ICAVs in 2014 and is rarely used for new Irish QIAIFs.
- Unit Trust. Dates from 1990 and offers similar features to the ICAV (e.g. U.S. "check-the-box" functionality, no risk spreading, light governance); unlike an ICAV, it cannot be self-managed and must have an AIFM; Irish trust law has complex tax planning features (e.g. separation of legal and beneficial ownership) which are attractive to individual investors and specific jurisdictions (e.g. U.K. and Japan).
- Common Contractual Fund ("CCF"). Established in 2003 for pensions funds to comingle, or pool, assets but maintain full legal segregation of the assets; it is an unincorporated body with no legal identity whose existence is the contract between its investors and the manager; the Irish equivalent of the fonds commun de placement ("FCF") structure in Luxembourg.
- Investment Limited Partnership ("ILP"). Primarily aimed at private equity–type structures with a General Partner ("GP")/Limited Partner ("LP") system; dates from the 1994 Investment Limited Partnerships Act; like a unit trust or CCF, the ILP is a contract and not a separate legal identity; the ICAV is more popular for private equity funds in Ireland.

== L-QIAIF ==
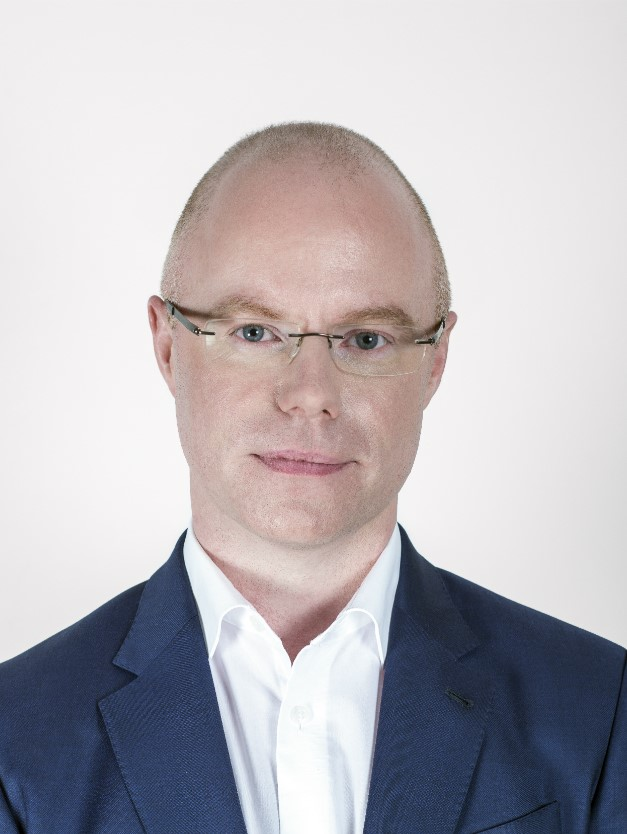
Stephen Donnelly TD uncovered abuses of Section 110 SPVs in 2016, and warned that making commercial property tax-free to foreign investors, via QIAIFs, would cause an office bubble and a housing crisis.

Ireland is considered by some academic studies to be a major tax haven, and offshore financial centre, with a range of base erosion and profit shifting ("BEPS") tools. Ireland's main debt–based BEPS tool was the Section 110 SPV. However, Irish public tax scandals in 2016 concerning the use of this BEPS tool – involving artificial Irish children's charities – by U.S. distressed funds, assisted by the leading Irish tax-law firms, to avoid billions in Irish taxes damaged its reputation (see Section 110 abuses).

In late 2016, the Central Bank of Ireland began a consultation process to upgrade the little-used L–QIAIF regime. In February 2018, the Central Bank of Ireland changed its AIF "Rulebook" to allow L–QIAIFs to hold the same assets that Section 110 SPVs could own. However, the upgraded L-QIAIFs offered two specific improvements over the Section 110 SPV which make L–QIAIFs a superior Debt–based BEPS tool:

1. Tax secrecy. Unlike the Section 110 SPV, the L–QIAIFs are not required to file public accounts (this was how the Section 110 tax abuses were uncovered), but file confidential accounts with the Central Bank of Ireland, that are protected under the 1942 Central Bank Secrecy Act;
2. No need for Profit Participating Notes ("PPN"). Another weakness of Section 110 SPVs was their reliance on artificial PPNs to execute the BEPS movement. L–QIAIFs do not require PPNs, and are thus more robust from an OECD compliance perspective.

Three months after the Irish Central Bank updated its AIF "Rulebook", the Irish Revenue Commissioners issued new guidance in May 2018 on Section 110 SPV taxation which would further reduce their attractiveness as a mechanism to avoid Irish taxes on Irish assets. In June 2018, the Central Bank of Ireland reported that €55 billion of U.S.-owned distressed Irish assets, equivalent to almost 25% of Irish GNI*, moved out of Section 110 SPVs. The L-QIAIF, and the ICAV wrapper, in particular, is expected to become an important structure for managing Irish tax on Irish assets in a confidential manner.

Ireland has Irish Real Estate Funds (IREFs) for holding direct Irish property which are not tax-free, their holdings relate to Irish quoted REITs (e.g. Green REIT plc), and insurance assets. The investments by US distressed debt funds in Irish property are via loan acquisitions and thus use L-QIAIFs. In addition, foreign investors in Irish property can still use the L-QIAIF by holding via structured loans domiciled abroad, thus also avoiding Irish taxes in a confidential manner.

== Abuses ==
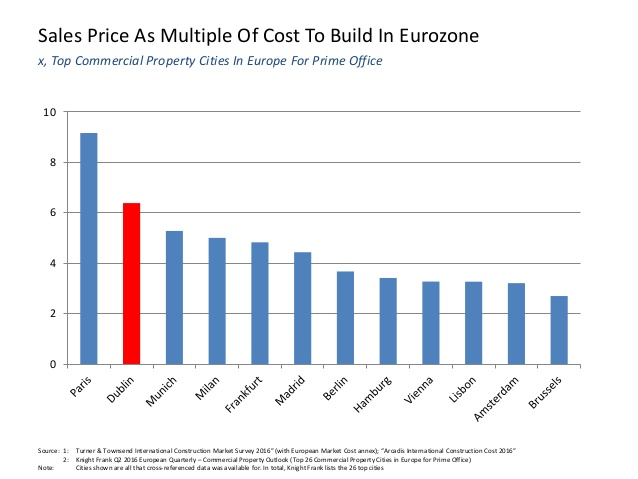
Comparison of the sales price as multiple of the cost of build, for a prime office in Dublin, with EU–28 countries (2016).

The QIAIF regime has contributed to making the International Financial Services Centre (IFSC) one of the largest fund domiciling and shadow banking locations in Europe. Many asset managers, and particularly alternative investment managers, use Irish QIAIF wrappers in structuring funds. However, fund structuring is a competitive market and other corporate tax havens such as Luxembourg offer equivalent products. It is asserted that many of the assets in Irish QIAIFs are Irish assets, and particularly from the sale of over €100 billion in distressed assets by the Irish State from 2012–2017.

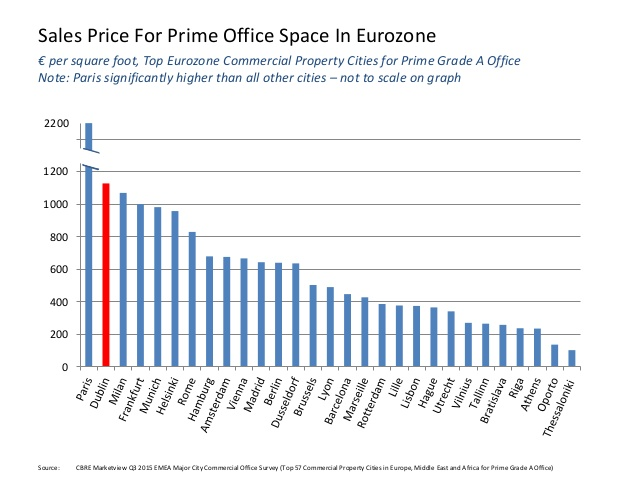
Comparison of the sales price of Dublin prime office with EU–28 countries (2016).

Irish QIAIFs have been used in tax avoidance on Irish assets. It transpired that the regulator of Irish QIAIFs, the Central Bank of Ireland, was paying rent to a U.S. entity using an Irish QIAIF ICAV to avoid Irish taxes on the rent. Irish QIAIFs have been used to circumvent international regulations, on avoiding tax laws in the EU and the U.S. Irish QIAIFs can be combined with Irish corporate BEPS tools (e.g. the Orphaned Super–QIF), to create confidential routes out of the Irish corporate tax system to other tax havens such as Luxembourg, the main Sink OFC for Ireland.

QIAIFs link Ireland's strength as a corporate-focused tax haven, with the world's largest corporate BEPS tools, to more traditional tax haven type activities (why Cayman SPCs are re-domiciling as Irish ICAVs). The launch of the Irish ICAV was widely covered, and praised, by the leading offshore magic circle law firms, the largest of which, Maples and Calder, claimed to have been one of its chief architects.

The ability of foreign institutions to use QIAIFs and the ICAV wrapper, to avoid Irish taxes on Irish assets, has been linked to the bubble in Dublin commercial property, and by implication, the Dublin housing crisis. Despite Dublin's housing crisis, and issues of housing affordability, foreign landlords (also called "cuckoo funds") operate in Ireland on a tax-free basis. It is asserted that property development, and over-inflation of property prices via tax incentives, are favoured historical economic strategies of the two main Irish political parties, Fianna Fáil and Fine Gael. (Note: As discussed in Modified gross national income, the high levels of BEPS tools in Ireland's economy means that its GDP is artificially inflated (e.g. in 2018, Irish GDP was 163% of Irish GNI*); academics have noted that the Irish State has traditionally bridged the gap to the distorted Irish GDP, by increasing the level of credit in the economy, and may have used property debt as the main tool for this.)

This risk of QIAIFs was highlighted in 2014 when Central Bank of Ireland consulted the European Systemic Risk Board ("ESRB") after initial, and unsuccessful, lobbying by IFSC tax-law firms to expand the L–QIAIF regime, so as to remove Irish taxation from Irish loan investments. (Note: As discussed earlier in relation to Irish Section 110 SPVs, at the time Irish Section 110 SPVs were being used to avoid Irish taxation on Irish loan investments, however Section 110 SPVs had to file Irish public accounts, which led to a public scandal in 2016 when the level of Irish taxes being avoided by U.S. funds was revealed)

In March 2019, the UN Special Rapporter on housing, Leilani Farha, formally wrote to the Irish Government on behalf of the UN, regarding its concerns regarding "preferential tax laws" for foreign investment funds on Irish assets which were compromising the human rights of tenants in Ireland.

In April 2019, Irish technology entrepreneur Paddy Cosgrave launched a Facebook campaign to highlight abuses of QIAIFs and L-QIAIFs, stating: "The L-QIAIF runs the risk of being a weapon of mass destruction".

== See also ==
- Corporation tax in the Republic of Ireland
- Matheson (law firm)
- Maples and Calder
- Offshore magic circle
- Ireland as a tax haven
