= Brass plate company =

Company of no physical substance

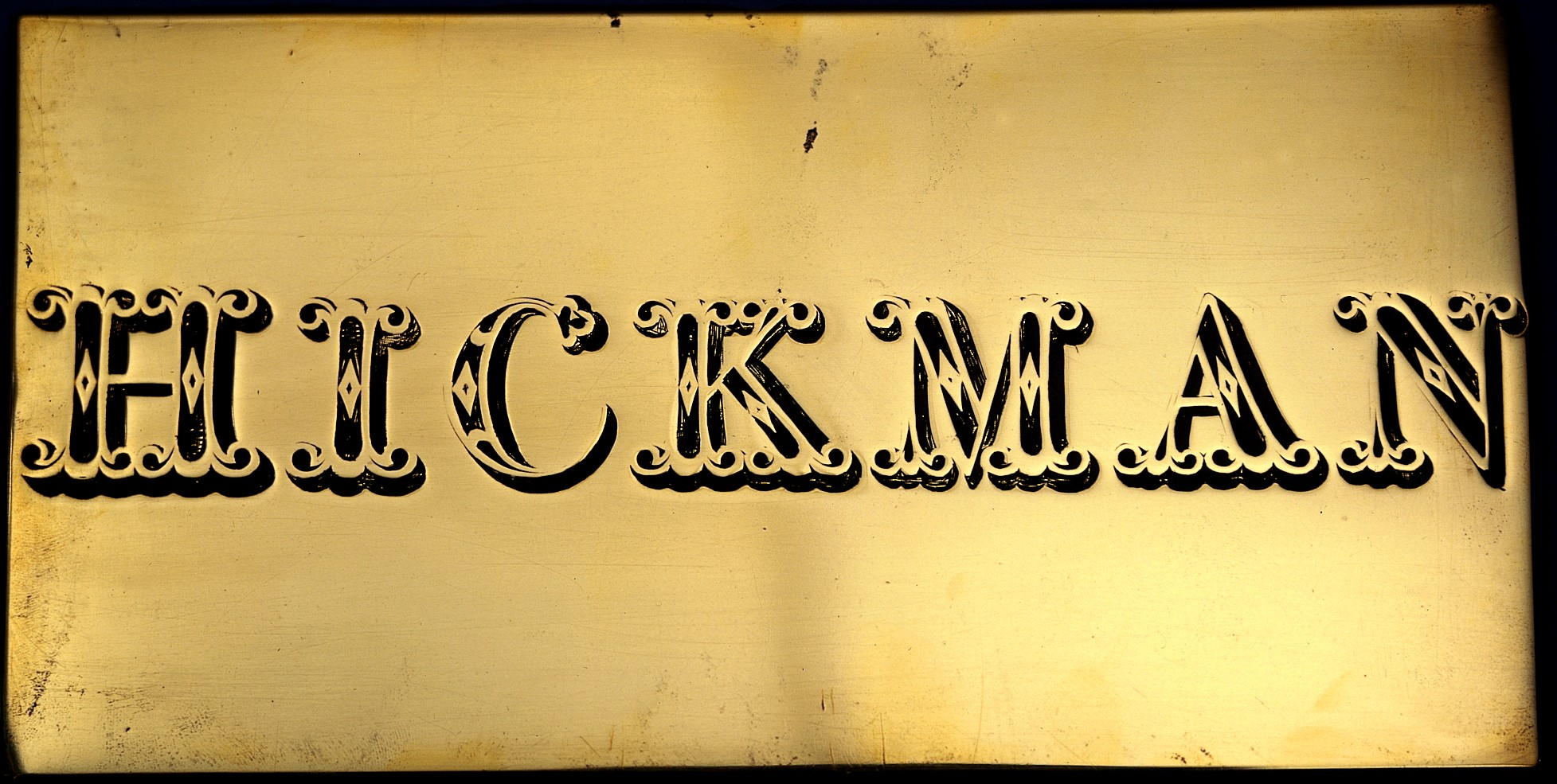
A brass nameplate

A brass plate company, or brass plate trust, is a legally constituted company lacking meaningful connection with the location of incorporation. Brass plate refers to the only tangible existence of an organization in its jurisdiction of incorporation being a nameplate attached to the wall outside its registered office. The registered office is often the same office and address of the local professional service firm(s) or corporate service provider(s) (CSPs), (e.g. legal, accounting or secretarial) who act as local support to the company. Brass plate structures are associated with tax havens, corporate tax havens, and offshore financial centres.

== Definitions ==
In the landmark Inspire Art ruling, the ECJ defined a brass plate company (in an EU context) as being a "... company (formed under the laws of a member state) which lacks any real connection with the State of formation ...". The ECJ ruled that, with certain caveats, brass plate companies were legitimate in the EU. The ECJ previously used the term letterbox company, in the landmark Centros ruling, in relation to companies using various EU incorporation locations (in a brass plate fashion) to avoid unfavorable local regulations in their home EU location, in conducting their business.

While legally similar (if not identical), the term letterbox company is usually used if the company legally trades with the general public (as per the Centros case) from its location (i.e. appears as the legal address in a catalogue marketing firm), while all other types are called brass plate companies (i.e. private investment firms).

Neither brass plate companies nor letterbox companies should be confused with shell companies. Shell companies can be incorporated in the full "home base" of the main parent company (they don't have to be located in an unconnected foreign location); their key feature is that they have no assets (other than cash, as used in some definitions). A company can be a brass plate shell company (foreign base, no assets), or just a brass plate company (foreign base, many assets), or just a shell company (home base, no assets).

In practice, it is very common for a brass plate companies not to be shell companies; however, many shell companies are often brass plate companies. This is because a very common driver of creating a shell company is often to legally move a business activity to a different location from the "home base".

== Etymology ==
Brass plate company refers to the company's perhaps only tangible existence in its jurisdiction of incorporation: the nameplate (historically, often made of brass) attached to the wall outside the company's registered office.

== Controls ==
While accepted in the EU (from above ECJ rulings), the term brass plate company has become most commonly associated with offshore tax havens (i.e. Cayman Islands, British Virgin Islands etc.) Thus the term brass plate company is often used in the pejorative sense (especially in the media) and associated with undesirable nefarious activities (i.e. tax evasion, money laundering or arms trafficking etc.).

Because of this, more reputable "onshore" financial centres (i.e. Ireland, Luxembourg, Netherlands), who enjoy access to major global tax treaties, generally steer clear of any implication that they are open to brass plate companies for fear of being labelled corporate tax havens, and therefore losing access to the global tax treaty networks.

Regulators in these onshore financial centres control the spread of brass plate companies by enforcing stronger tax residency rules that require greater "commercial substance" to occur in the regulator's jurisdiction (also known as the "central management and control" test in UK case law). Typical criteria used include:

- having a majority of local tax resident Directors on the Board
- all the books and records of the company are held in the jurisdiction
- the audit of the company is carried out by a professional firm in the jurisdiction
- a minimum number of Board meetings are held each year in the jurisdiction
- all major decisions regarding the company are made at Board meetings in the jurisdiction

There is a level of scepticism over whether such controls are really effective in controlling brass plate companies. The registered office is often the same office and address of the local professional service firm(s) or corporate service provider(s) (CSPs), (i.e. legal, accounting or secretarial etc.) who act as local support to the company. It is not uncommon for CSPs to have hundreds of brass plate companies legally registered at their office. CSPs in onshore financial centres are capable of providing local directors, administration and other services designed to meet the minimum "central management and control test" for moderate fees. A recent academic study into Irish Section 110 SPVs found individual CSP officers acting as "local directors" for hundreds of SPVs, and found little evidence of any substance to the "central management and control" test.

== Examples ==
Notable examples of entities accused of using brass plate structures for unsavoury activities include (notice the term "brass plate" being used by the media in the attached references):

- Panama Papers. This affair uncovered literally thousands of "brass plate" companies (and trusts) that were being used by individuals all over the world (including some high-profile persons), for undesirable purposes (most commonly tax avoidance). Many of the articles in the global media covering the affair used the term "brass plate".
- Apple Sales International (“ASI”) in Ireland. A "brass plate" company used by Apple; legally registered in Ireland, but not tax resident in Ireland as it was “managed and controlled” from Bermuda. The EU Commission allege this structure was in violation of EU State Aid Rules (by paying no Irish taxes), and have fined Apple €13bn (plus interest) as a result.
- Orphan SPVs. These are by definition "brass plate" companies used in legitimate global securitisation transactions. However, the anonymity of "orphaning", the accepted complexity of their structuring, and their availability in well respected onshore locations (i.e. Irish Section 110 SPVs), has led to a rise in their use for less legitimate purposes (i.e. shadow banking, tax avoidance).

== See also ==
- Ireland as a tax haven
