= Iran Central Asset Management Company =

Central Asset Management Company
- شرکت مدیریت دارایی مرکزی بازار سرمایه
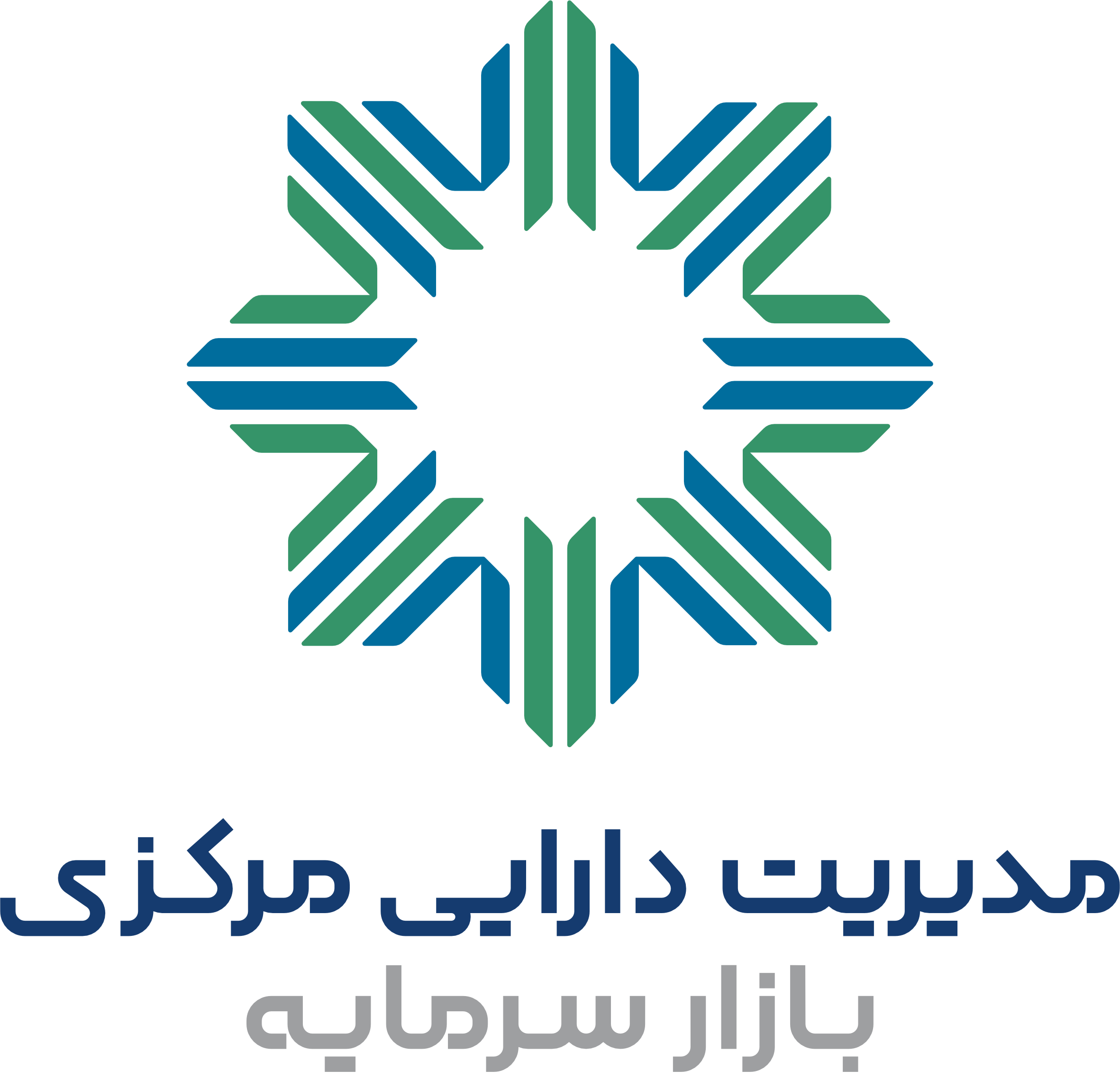
- Type: Stock Exchange
- Location: Tehran, Iran
- Founded: 2010
- Owner: Central Securities Depository of Iran, Corporative Co. of the Staff of Securities and Exchange Organization, Stock Exchange Co.
- Key people: Mr. GHolamreza Aboutorabi
- Currency: Iranian rial
- Commodities: Issuance of Sukuk
- Website: http://sukuk.ir/en

Central Asset Management Company (Persian: شرکت مدیریت دارایی مرکزی بازار سرمایه)which has been established under article 2 SPVs activities instruction approved by high council of stock exchange in August 2010. The main goals of this company are: establishment and management of SPVs.

== Objectives ==
Central Asset Management Company embarks on establishing SPVs (Limited Corporations) in order to use them with regard to the process of issuance of securities.
