= Matheson (law firm) =

Irish corporate law firm

Coordinates: 53.345528°N 6.234958°W

- Headquarters: 70 Sir John Rogerson's Quay, Grand Canal Dock, Dublin 2, D02 R296, Dublin, Ireland
- No. of offices: 6 offices in 3 countries (Dublin, Cork, London, New York, San Francisco, Palo Alto)
- No. of lawyers: 122 partners
- No. of employees: 860
- Major practice areas: Tax law
- Key people: Michael Jackson; Managing Partner
- Revenue: €115 million 2016 est.
- Date founded: 1825 only 14 partners in 1991
- Company type: Limited liability partnership
- Website: www.matheson.com

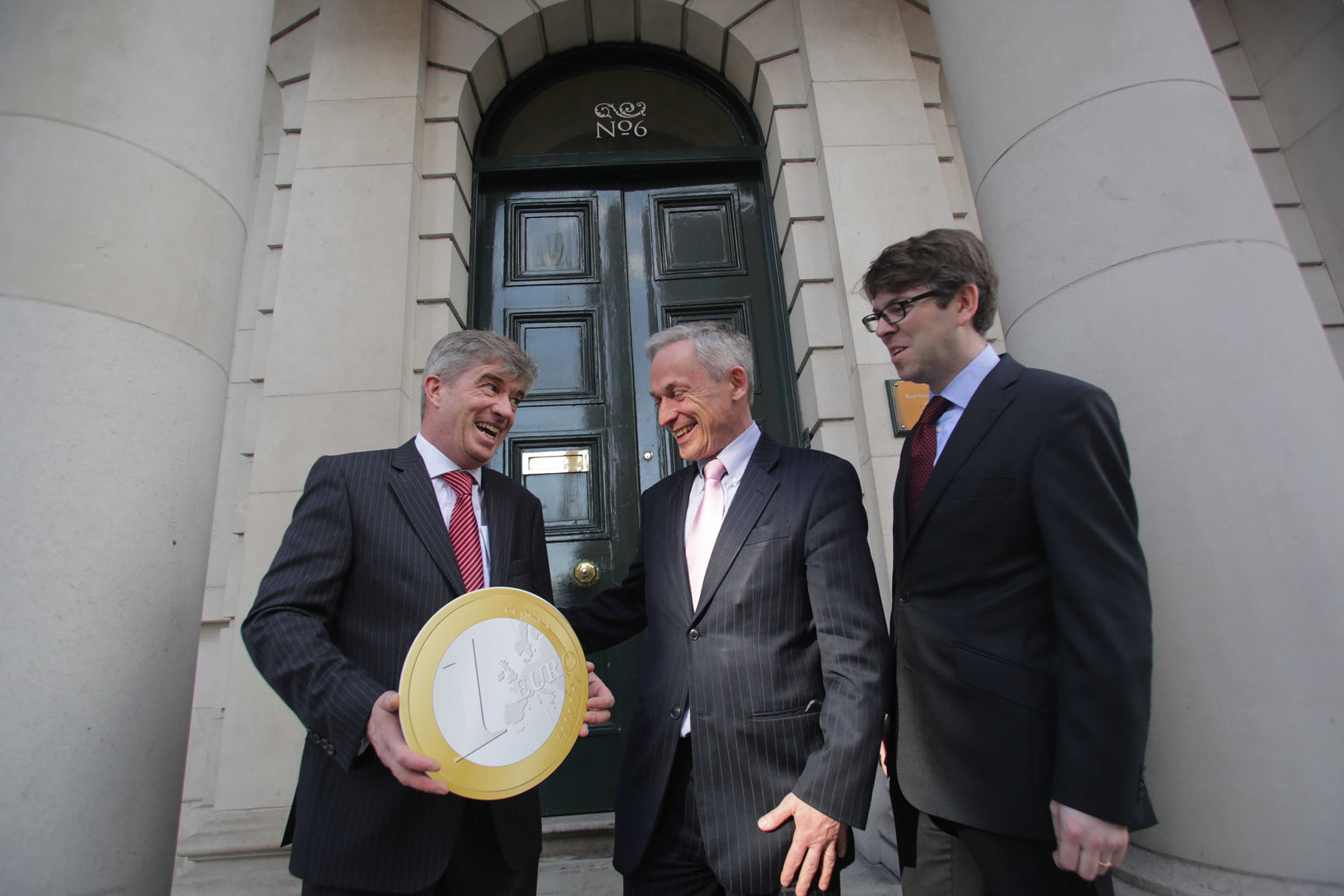
Irish Debt Securities Association (IDSA) launch in 2013 with Minister Richard Bruton, IDSA CEO Gary Palmer, and IDSA Chairman Turlough Galvin of Matheson's Tax Practice.

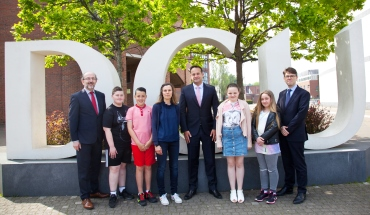
Matheson Foundation Chairman Turlough Galvin, and Irish Taoiseach Leo Varadkar, honour 150 children from the Centre for Talented Youth Ireland (CTYI) in 2016.

Matheson (previously Matheson Ormsby Prentice), is an Irish law firm partnership based in the IFSC in Dublin, which specialises in multinational tax schemes (e.g. for clients in Ireland such as Microsoft, Google and Abbot), and tax structuring of special purpose vehicles (e.g. Section 110 securitisation SPVs). Matheson is estimated to be Ireland's largest corporate law firm. Matheson state in the International Tax Review that their tax department is: "significantly the largest tax practice group amongst Irish law firms".

== History ==
While Matheson's website traces their history back to 1825 and notes that their offices were burnt in the Irish Easter Rising of 1916, it wasn't until after the creation and initial development of Dublin's International Financial Services Centre (or IFSC) that Matheson emerged as a small but standalone law firm with 14 partners and over 50 solicitors (or lawyers) in 1991.

In 1996, the firm moved to a dedicated office at 30 Herbert Street in Dublin. The property was developed by Treasury Holdings and designed by Arthur Gibney & Partners architects.

It later moved to offices at 70 Sir John Rogerson's Quay in 2007, and rebranded as "Matheson" in October 2012.

While A&L Goodbody and Arthur Cox still lead Irish corporate law, Matheson has grown with the rise in the IFSC to become one of Ireland's five largest corporate law firms along with McCannFitzgerald and Mason, Hayes and Curran. Matheson focuses on the two legal areas most associated with the IFSC, namely tax structuring for U.S. multinationals, and creating IFSC–domiciled corporate tax structures and tax efficient vehicles for various asset management and asset financing activities (particularly securitisation special purpose vehicles, which the IFSC leads in the EU–28).

In 2013 Matheson founded the Irish Debt Securities Association (or IDSA), which acts as the industry lobby group for the Irish Section 110 Special Purpose Vehicle (SPV) (the IFSC's main securitisation structure). Like Feargal O'Rourke in PriceWaterhouseCoopers, Matheson has been an active lobbyist for expanding various Irish legal structures and amending taxation controls to help grow the IFSC, which can lead to conflict. Matheson's leadership in IFSC tax structures (or IP–based BEPS tools, and Debt–based BEPS tools), makes them a noted industry commentator.

== Awards ==
Matheson's leadership in the area of U.S. multinational tax planning in Ireland, a jurisdiction which is ranked as one of the world's top corporate havens has seen Matheson win major awards from the international corporate tax planning industry, including:

- Ireland Transfer Pricing Firm of the Year, International Tax Review 2018
- Ireland's Most Innovative Law Firm, Financial Times Innovative Lawyer Awards 2017
- European Financial Services Tax Deal of the Year, International Tax Review 2017
- Ireland Tax Firm of the Year, International Tax Review 2016
- European M&A Tax Firm of the Year, International Tax Review 2016

== Criticism ==
=== U.S. multinational tax schemes ===
Matheson's leadership in the Irish tax strategies of U.S. multinationals, (or BEPS tools), has attracted attention from U.S. media over the years. In 2005, the Wall Street Journal ran a story on how Microsoft used an Irish subsidiary called "Round Ireland One" to avoid billions in U.S. taxes which was structured and registered in Matheson's offices (was then Matheson Ormsby Prentice, or MOP). In 2013 the Wall Street Journal ran another investigation showing that the scale of U.S. operations in Ireland, using Matheson registered tax structures, had dramatically increased from 2005. These strategies has seen Ireland labelled as one of the world's largest corporate tax havens, and blacklisted by Brazil. In 2019, it was reported that Abbott used Matheson to avoid billions in U.S. taxes.

Like other tax law firms in the IFSC, Matheson has openly marketed IP–based BEPS tools with effective tax rates of under 3%.

Mainstream U.S. media channels have singled out Matheson in Dublin, as a significant centre for U.S. multinational tax strategies.

In this regard, Matheson is akin to the situation of Irish PwC Managing Partner Feargal O'Rourke, whose development of the double Irish IP–based BEPS tool, has also made him the subject of investigative pieces by the U.S. financial media. Bloomberg recognise that O'Rourke, while being at the vanguard of legitimate but aggressive U.S. multinational tax planning, is considered a "hero" in Ireland.

=== Section 110 tax schemes and children's charities ===
In 2016, Matheson was criticised in the Irish media when it was revealed that U.S. distressed debt funds (known pejoratively as "vulture funds" in the Irish media), had used the services of Irish IFSC securitisation law firms to avoid billions in Irish taxes, on Irish distressed assets by using Irish Section 110 SPVs. These structures were created so IFSC law firms could administer global securitisation transactions. Matheson featured as one of the most frequently used advisors by the U.S. distressed debt funds (with A&L Goodbody).

The affair escalated into the "vulture fund tax avoidance" scandal, when it was found Matheson used three in-house children's charities (Eurydice, Medb and Badb), to make the Irish Section 110 SPV work in an Irish domestic setting (known as "orphaning"). This was a purpose for which Finance Minister Michael Noonan acknowledged "the Section 110 legislation was not set up for". The affair became a major Irish scandal and was reported in the international media. The Irish State closed the loopholes, and prohibit Irish charities from being used in tax avoidance structures.

=== Panama Papers exposure ===
It was revealed in the Irish section of the Panama Papers leak of 2016, that a senior partner in Matheson, Stanley Watson, had established an offshore tax structure with Mossack Fonseca's help in Cyprus, to reduce his tax bill on moving to London to set up the Matheson London office. A woman in the Matheson Dublin office was helping handle the correspondence to establish the structure. The affair caused further embarrassment for Matheson when Stanley Watson's Isle of Man advisor was recorded as describing Matheson to Mossack Fonseca as "our biggest client".

== See also ==
- Double Irish, Single Malt, Capital Allowances for Intangible Assets ("CAIA")
- Irish Financial Services Centre
- Irish Section 110 Special Purpose Vehicle (SPV)
- Qualifying investor alternative investment fund (QIAIF)
- Offshore magic circle
- Ireland as a tax haven
- Maples and Calder
