= Local property tax (Ireland) =

Tax on residential properties in Ireland

The local property tax (LPT) is annual self-assessed tax charged on the market value of all residential properties in Ireland. It came into effect on 1 July 2013 and is collected by the Revenue Commissioners. The tax is assessed on residential properties. The owner of a property is liable (though in the case of leases over twenty years, the tenant becomes liable). The revenue raised is used to fund the provision of services by local authorities and includes transfers between local authorities.

== Valuation and rates ==
The tax is based upon the assessed market value of the property in May 2013. This valuation is to be used as the basis for a half-year payment in 2013, as well as 3 further full year payments in 2014, 2015 and 2016. The tax due is calculated via a system of market bands. The initial national central rate of the tax is 0.18% of a property's value up to €1 million, and in the case of properties valued over €1 million, 0.25% on the balance. From 1 January 2015, local authorities will be able to vary LPT rates -/+ 15% of the national central rate.

Valuation band (€)	Midpoint of valuation band (€)	LPT in 2014 (1 yr) (€)
0 to 100,000	50,000	90
100,001 to 150,000	125,000	225
150,001 to 200,000	175,000	315
200,001 to 250,000	225,000	405
250,001 to 300,000	275,000	495
300,001 to 350,000	325,000	585
350,001 to 400,000	375,000	675
400,001 to 450,000	425,000	765
450,001 to 500,000	475,000	855
500,001 to 550,000	525,000	945
550,001 to 600,000	575,000	1,035
600,001 to 650,000	625,000	1,125
650,001 to 700,000	675,000	1,215
700,001 to 750,000	725,000	1,305
750,001 to 800,000	775,000	1,395
800,001 to 850,000	825,000	1,485
850,001 to 900,000	875,000	1,575
900,001 to 950,000	925,000	1,665
950,001 to 1,000,000	975,000	1,755

In the case of properties valued over €1 million, no banding applies – 0.18% is charged on the first €1 million (€1,800) and 0.25% on the balance. The government estimates that 85% to 90% of all properties falls within the first five taxation bands.

=== Exemptions ===
If some conditions are met, certain properties are exempt from LPT. Each exemption has its own set of qualifications.

These types of properties may be exempt from Local Property Tax (LPT):

- Properties that have been certified as having significant pyrite damage

- Properties constructed with faulty concrete blocks

- Residential properties owned by a charitable organization or a public body

- Nursing homes that are licensed

- Commercial real estate

- Properties that have been vacated by their owners due to illness

- Property purchased, constructed, or adapted for a person who is permanently and completely disabled

- Properties used as residential accommodation by charitable organizations

In order to claim an exemption as part of your LPT Return, you must provide certain information, such as your name, PPSN, property ID, and property address. Additionally, some exemptions may require you to submit supporting documentation to Revenue.

To claim an exemption for the years 2023 to 2025, even if you missed claiming it for 2022, you can reach out to the LPT branch in Revenue. If you have already submitted an LPT Return without claiming an exemption, you should contact Revenue again.

== Payment ==
On 6 May 2013, the Revenue Commissioners reported that 1.2 m household lds (74%) have paid the property tax. In August 2013, the Revenue said 1.58 m households have paid the tax, and over €175 m has been collected. Anyone who still has not paid by August 2013, will have the tax deducted from their salary or pension.

== Previous property taxes ==
=== Household charge ===
The household charge was introduced by the Local Government (Household Charge) Act 2011, for collection in 2012. It was a flat-rate charge of €100 on each principal private residence, and acted as a precursor for the local property tax.

=== Non-principal private residence charge ===
The non-principal private residence charge was introduced by the Local Government (Charges) Act 2009, for collection from 2009 to 2012. It was a flat-rate charge of €200, that was payable respect of residential property that was not the owner's only or main residence.

=== Residential property tax ===
The residential property tax was introduced in the Finance Act 1983 and was abolished on 5 April 1997.

It was an annual tax, charged at the rate of 1.5% per annum on the portion of the market value of an owner-occupied house which was greater than (in 1996) £101,000, as long as the household income exceeded £30,100.

Exemption from the RPT was possible if certain buildings were open to the public. This means that the exemption from RPT was possible in the case of property such as Charles Haughey's Kinsealy mansion—partially open for the Irish Cancer Society's Daffodil Day.

=== Rates ===
Prior to 1977, all property owners in Ireland had to pay "rates" – based on the "rateable valuation" of the property – to the local council. Rates were used by local authorities to provide services such as mains water and refuse collection. Rates for private residences were abolished in 1977, with local authorities instead receiving funding from central government. They continue in operation for commercial property.

Refuse collection services are no longer operated or funded by local authorities in Ireland.

== See also ==
- Hearth tax
