= FIN 46 =

US accounting standard interpretation

FIN 46, Consolidation of Variable Interest Entities, was an interpretation of United States Generally Accepted Accounting Principles (U.S. GAAP) published on January 17, 2003, by the U.S. Financial Accounting Standards Board (FASB) that made it more difficult to remove assets and liabilities from a company's balance sheet if the company retained an economic exposure to the assets and liabilities. One of the main reasons FIN 46 was issued as an interpretation instead of an accounting standard was to issue the standard in a relatively short period of time in response to the Enron scandal.

== Origins ==
FIN 46 was an interpretation of ARB 51, an accounting principle issued in August 1959 defining the situations where Consolidated Financial Statements must be prepared. Whenever a company has a controlling financial interest in another entity it must consolidate the assets and liabilities of the other entity—that is, it must add the assets and liabilities of the other entity to its own, canceling any intercompany interests. The traditional ARB 51 approach assumed that equity—usually common stock—would receive the residual economic interest generated by a business, which is why ARB 51 focuses on equity-based majority voting interests. The traditional criterion for a controlling financial interest under ARB 51 is a majority voting interest. In the 1980s and 1990s it became common for companies to control assets in certain businesses without maintaining a majority voting interest in those businesses. This was more often done with securitizations rather than traditional limited liability corporations, because the securitization's common stock or other voting interests could be paid defined, limited amounts and all other cash flows could be directed to other security holders. Until FIN 46 was implemented, this enabled companies to avoid consolidation, which permitted them to keep the liabilities and losses of their controlled special purpose entities off of their financial statements. In such cases, consolidation based on equity did not serve the purpose of effective reporting because it does not reflect the true nature of relationships among entities.

== VIEs and Deconsolidation ==
FIN 46 closed this loophole by defining tests to identify a controlling financial interest beyond formal equity ownership and voting rights. This is important in cases where the legal equity is insignificant or at least somewhat irrelevant from the viewpoint of risk/rewards. The new rules emphasize the substance of relationships among entities, rather than emphasizing the form of relationships among entities (such as a majority voting interest), which can be more easily manipulated.

Under FIN 46, the first step is to determine if a company has a variable interest in another entity. In general terms, a variable interest is an interest in an entity that increases and decreases in value (i.e., is variable) according to increases and decreases in the expected cash flows from the entity's assets and liabilities. Once a variable interest is established, the second step is to determine who is the primary beneficiary of the variable interest entity (or "VIE"). The primary beneficiary is the entity, if any, that holds the majority of the risks and rewards associated with the VIE. Once a primary beneficiary is identified, it is deemed to have a controlling financial interest in the VIE and must consolidate the VIE onto its financial statements, whether or not it holds a majority voting interest.

When FASB first began working on FIN 46, it focused on special purpose entities such as the entities Enron used. FASB then recognized that the principles of FIN 46 should apply to all entities where a variable interest exists, so the final interpretation was broader than the original objective. Also, in a securitization, if a party selling assets to a VIE maintains an ongoing involvement with those assets (for example as a swap counterparty to the VIE with respect to asset cashflows) then Financial Accounting Standard 140 (FAS 140), which deals with de-recognition of assets upon transfer to a special purpose entity, will also be relevant.

== Replacement ==
FIN 46 was revised by FIN 46(R) on December 24, 2003 which, among other things, defined in more detail the calculation of an entity's economic risks and rewards, which party must consolidate a variable interest entity, and when a consolidation or deconsolidation should be reconsidered. FIN 46R was then replaced by a new accounting standard, FASB Statement 167, in June 2009, after the 2008 financial crisis.

== See also ==
- U.S. GAAP
