= Corporate services =

Activities combining enterprise support services

Corporate services or business services are activities which combine or consolidate certain enterprise-wide needed support services, provided based on specialized knowledge, best practices, and technology to serve internal (and sometimes external) customers and business partners. The term corporate services providers (CSPs) is also used.

Corporate Service Providers may work in a diverse set of fields such as finance, consulting, IT service management, advisory services, auditing and so forth. Typically the emphasis of the service agreement is on providing clients with an improved functional and experiential quality over time.

In the United Kingdom, the public audit agencies produced a report in May 2007 called "Value for Money in public sector corporate services". This provides performance indicators in five categories: Finance, Human Resources, Information & Communication Technology, Procurement, and Estates Management.

== Examples of corporate services ==
=== Business advisory service ===
A Business Advisory Service counsels clients re the current and future state of their Company, with the aim of advancing the prospects of the enterprise in question. This service, used across various industries, involves (i) examining the relevant legal, tax, financial, market, and/or risk factors, and then (ii) advising re start-up (including company formation), or more common, re ongoing strategic and operational improvements to the business.

=== Company incorporation ===
Company incorporation is the process of forming a company corporation officially in the country of residence. It is also possible non-residents to set up a company: see offshore company. However, laws vary in all countries. International corporate service consultants specialise in dealing with incorporation in the country in question. Once application is successful, the company will receive a certificate of incorporation. Which provides valid existence of the company under the registered name given.

=== Registered agent ===
A registered agent, also known as a resident agent or statutory agent, is a business or individual designated to receive service of process (SOP) when a business entity is a party in a legal action such as a lawsuit or summons. Some examples of related services include:

- Compliance services
- Business licensing
- DBA Doing Business As filings.
- Preparation and filing of reports that must be filed from time to time (Annual, Biennial, etc.)

=== Finance and banking ===
Corporate services such as finance and banking were first introduced to remove pressure from the client's organisation when dealing with complex banking and finance issues. Specialist information and tips are provided by the consultancy to manage finances appropriately, and some can set up a corporate bank account for clients. Some examples of tailored services include:

- Corporate bank accounts
- Offshore bank accounts
- Multi-currency accounts
- Brokerage accounts
- Private banking
- Corporate loan applications

=== Accounting and tax services ===
Accounting and tax services are useful for companies wanting to outsource their basic work. The services involve preparing and submitting obligatory documents required by authorities associated with business practice. Some basic services include:

- Payroll
- Maintaining cash flow books
- Tax registration
- Tax returns
- Corporation tax
- Tax avoidance (international)

=== Investment and stock exchange ===
Market research for investment along with risk evaluation is another corporate service designed to help clients make financial decisions. Intellectual property protection is seen as an investment, this is a service some consultancies may also advise on. Similarly, stock exchange services can bring about specialist reports on past, current and forecasted stock exchange trends, with a personalised analysis.

=== Offshore bundled services ===
Where local Corporate Service Providers (CSPs) offer bundled basic services to support tax residency tests such as "central management and control" type tests (typical in UK law) of a brass plate company, shell company or other special-purpose vehicle that has been set up in the jurisdiction. Usually located in either offshore financial centres or in onshore financial centres. Typical services include:

- Maintain books and records
- Compiling annual accounts
- Conducting annual audits
- Filing tax returns
- Providing local Directors
- Providing registered office address
- Providing meeting rooms for Board meetings

== Legal aspects ==
In ordinary circumstances, corporate service providers may not, or alternatively will not, act as a trustee for the clients which they provide services to. This is to maintain the integrity of the client organization and its ability to represent itself in legal processes. It also avoids excessive risk on behalf of the purveyor of corporate services.

This practice seeks to ensure that the corporate personhood of the client is secured. Exceptions to this may be in litigations or corporate bankruptcy filings where the enterprise entity of the client is considered legally incapacitated and is therefor incapable of representing itself in a court process. In these rare cases the corporate service provider may decide to act as a trustee for the client.

== See also ==
- Big Four accounting firms
- Big Three (management consultancies)
- Consulting firm
- Financial adviser
