= Orphan structure =

Legal entity where the equity is owned by no-one

Orphan structure or Orphan SPV or orphaning are terms used in structured finance closely associated with creating SPVs ("Special Purpose Vehicles") for securitisation transactions where the notional equity of the SPV is deliberately handed over to an unconnected 3rd party who themselves have no control over the SPV; thus the SPV becomes an "orphan" whose equity is controlled by no one.

== Description ==
In an orphaned SPV, the equity is held by a 3rd party with no legal relationship to the two main parties engaging in the securitisation (the asset user(s), and the lender(s) financing the assets). While this 3rd party legally "owns" the equity of the SPV, the way in which their ownership is structured gives them no control over the SPV.

The driver for orphaning is to enable the securitisation transaction to be held off-balance sheet. If the asset users, or the asset lenders, owned (or legally controlled) the SPV equity, then the SPV would be consolidated into their group accounts. This is something that the lenders to the SPV have to avoid as they are mostly banks and only want to give in loans. Users of the asset may want to avoid if their borrowing limits may have been reached (or they want a regulatory/liability firewall between themselves and the asset(s)).

Orphaned SPV structures allow lenders to separate the asset finance, from the asset user(s), thus enabling them to move the asset to other users(s) should the situation arise (e.g. bankruptcy of a user), without having to recreate a new SPV and/or reraise new loans.

Orphaning is at the heart of global securitisation transactions, and without orphaning, most securitisation SPVs would cease to be useful or effective to their creators.

An orphaned SPV is, by definition, an artificial creation as everybody knows who "controls" the SPV. There are instances outside of securitisations where orphaned SPVs, and the ability to separate "true" owners from "legal" owners, can be used for tax avoidance. For example, restructuring equity into debt, and then relocating this debt to a tax haven via orphaned SPVs, is a classic abuse of orphaning. This is why orphaning is not available in all jurisdictions, and where it is offered in non-tax havens (i.e. where there are domestic taxes), it is strictly controlled and monitored by taxing authorities.

== Owners ==
The SPV is generally a limited liability company issued in either an offshore location (e.g. the Cayman Islands SPV) or an onshore location (e.g. Irish Section 110 SPV).

The key considerations in deciding what 3rd party entities are used to "own" the orphaned SPV equity are driven by:

1. Tax Integrity. The 3rd party must be credible, and legally separate from all other parties in the SPV, that the various national taxing authorities won't challenge the SPV under general anti-avoidance rules, and effectively force it back "on-balance sheet", rendering the SPV useless to the parties.
2. Bankruptcy Remoteness. The SPV lenders will want to ensure their securitisation vehicle is prevented from entering into a bankruptcy process thus losing control over the assets for an extended period, due to financial failings of the asset user(s), or the 3rd party equity owner itself. The lenders will want to take immediate control of the assets if a user(s) goes bankrupt
3. Conflicts/Control. The 3rd party must not be capable of damaging or attacking the SPV, taking a biased view on behalf of one party (i.e. lender or user) outside of the written agreements created on establishing the SPV, or even acting in a completely rogue manner, that would harm the interests of the main parties in the SPV.

Given the above, the orphaned SPV equity is usually held by a nominee share trustee company on trust pursuant to a Declaration of Trust (and never via an individual).

Specialist law firms provide such trust services (can often be a subsidiary of the law firm advising on the main SPV and/or securitisation transaction).

Often only a small number of shares are created for a nominal sum (the exact specific amounts depending on the specifics of the jurisdiction) as the "equity" of the SPV. These shares are then independently purchased by the 3rd party entity in question using their own funds to complete the purchase (cannot be paid for directly by the main parties).

Some jurisdictions have used Charitable Trusts due to their particular robustness to avoiding bankruptcy (not legally possible for it to enter a bankruptcy process), however, this had led to some public concerns over the integrity of the overall orphaned SPV structure (e.g. Matheson in Ireland), and has now been stopped in Ireland.

The Non-Charitable Purpose Trust is emerging as a preferred option in some jurisdictions.

== Abuses ==
The global securitisation market is large (circa US$10 trillion in assets) and involves multinationals getting assets financed by global banks structured in SPVs created by global law and accounting firms. The orphaned SPV structures they use are understood and accepted in many jurisdictions, by regulators and taxing authorities as vehicles in which to conduct global securitisation transactions.

Unfortunately, the global acceptance of the main orphaned SPV structures has attracted the attention of users who are not seeking to conduct standard tax-transparent securitisation transactions, but who have other aims and objectives which regulators and tax authorities did not envisage orphaned SPVs being used for.

- In 2016, it was discovered that US distressed debt funds used orphaned SPVs, known as Section 110 SPVs, to buy Irish distressed assets during the Irish financial crisis to avoid Irish taxes. By the time the loopholes were closed by the Irish Government, material amounts of tax revenues were lost to the Irish exchequer.
- In 2017–2018, academic research by Professor Jim Stewart in Trinity College Dublin, showed Russian financial entities were using the anonymity of orphaning, as well as the inherent complexity of securitisation transactions, to circumvent various international sanctions in moving money globally.

Ireland is the largest EU location for orphaned SPVs, and the above abuses have drawn warnings from the former Deputy Governor of the Central Bank of Ireland

== See also ==
- Irish Section 110 SPVs
- Purpose Trusts
- Bankruptcy Remoteness
