= Revenue Commissioners =

Irish customs, excise and taxation agency

The Revenue Commissioners
- Na Coimisinéirí Ioncaim
- Logo of the Office of the Revenue Commissioners

Office overview
- Formed: 21 February 1923; 103 years ago
- Preceding agencies: Commissioners of Inland Revenue; Commissioners of Customs and Excise
- Type: Revenue service
- Jurisdiction: Ireland
- Headquarters: Dublin Castle
- Motto: Irish Tax and Customs; Cáin agus Custaim na hÉireann
- Employees: 7,033 (6,843 FTE, 2023)
- Minister responsible: Simon Harris, Minister for Finance
- Office executives: Niall Cody, Chairman; Gerry Harrahill, Commissioner; Ruth Kennedy, Commissioner
- Key document: Revenue Commissioners Order, 1923
- Website: revenue.ie

The Revenue Commissioners (Irish: Na Coimisinéirí Ioncaim), commonly called Revenue, is the Irish Government agency responsible for customs, excise, taxation and related matters. Though Revenue can trace itself back to predecessors (with the Act of Union 1800 amalgamating its forerunners with HM Customs and Excise in the United Kingdom), the current organisation was created for the independent Irish Free State on 21 February 1923 by the Revenue Commissioners Order 1923 which established the Revenue Commissioners to carry out the functions that the Commissioners of Inland Revenue and the Commissioners of Customs and Excise had carried out in the Free State prior to independence. The Revenue Commissioners are responsible to the minister for finance.

== Overview ==
Revenue consists of a chairman and two commissioners, all of whom have the status of secretary general as used in Departments of State. The first commissioners, appointed by the President of the Executive Council W. T. Cosgrave, were Charles J. Flynn, William Denis Carey and William T. O'Brien as chairman. The current Commissioners are: Chairman Niall Cody, and Commissioners Michael Gladney and Gerry Harrahill. According to its 2023 Annual Report, Revenue had more than 7,000 full-time equivalent staff in December 2023.

Revenue is based in Dublin Castle and uses a symbol of its gates as its logo, while its staff work in almost all of the 26 counties of Ireland. The mission statement of Revenue is "to serve the community by fairly and efficiently collecting taxes and duties and implementing Customs controls".

From April 1979 until June 2000 Revenue had control of the issue of the Personal Public Service Number (then referred to as Revenue and Social Insurance Number) to individuals. In 1991 it delegated a block of numbers to the Department of Social Protection and on 19 June 2000, the issuing was transferred to the department entirely.

Since 1 July 2013 the local property tax (LPT), an annual self-assessed tax charged on the market value of all residential properties in Ireland, has been collected by the Revenue Commissioners.

== Notable cases ==
A number of cases involving the Revenue Commissioners have received widespread media attention and/or involved material funds:

=== Apple Inc ===
In August 2016, Revenue became central to the proposed application of what would have been the largest recorded tax fine in history. Following an investigation of Apple's transfer pricing arrangements with Ireland, the EU Commission initially found that Revenue had given rulings to Apple that amounted to €13 billion in State Aid. These findings were however rejected by Apple, Revenue and the Irish Government, and the findings (and fine) were later overturned by the EU's General Court.

=== Section 110 SPVs ===
US distressed debt funds were found to be using Section 110 SPVs to avoid material amounts of Irish taxes on their Irish domestic investments (a purpose for which these SPVs were not created). Revenue was the effective regulator (and gatekeeper) of Section 110 SPVs. Finance Minister Michael Noonan moved to address the abuse in the Finance Act 2016 and increase Revenue's oversight.

== Customs cutters ==
The Revenue Commissioners operate two customs cutters, R.C.C. Cosaint (or Protection) and R.C.C. Faire (or Watch) which entered service in 2025 and 2009 respectively. R.C.C. Suirbhéir was in service between 2004 and 2025. R.C.C. Faire and R.C.C. Suirbhéir were the first purpose-built cutters to be acquired for the Revenue Commissioners and were built by a Finnish company, Uudenkaupungin Työvene Oy, based on its RV-series patrol boat. R.C.C. Cosaint was built by a Spanish company, Astilleros Armon. The cutters perform maritime patrols to detect and prevent the smuggling of drugs, weapons and other prohibited goods into or out of Ireland and the European Union.

In August 2023, the Revenue Commissioners signed a contract for a new 35 metre cutter to replace Suirbhéir. The new vessel was built by a Spanish company, Astilleros Armon, and based on their H35 patrol series. Named the RCC Cosaint, it was delivered in August 2025 and replaced Suirbhéir near the end of 2025.

| Name | Image | Type | Entered service | Displacement | Length | Notes |
|---|---|---|---|---|---|---|
| RCC Suirbhéir | RCC Faire | Customs cutter | 2004 | 50 t | 23.6 m | |
| RCC Faire | RCC Faire | Customs cutter | 2009 | 50 t | 23.6 m | |
| RCC Cosaint | | Customs cutter | 2025 | | 35 m | To replace Suirbhéir |

== See also ==
- Taxation in the Republic of Ireland
- Corporation tax in the Republic of Ireland
- Criminal Assets Bureau
- Deposit Interest Retention Tax
- Vehicle registration plates of the Republic of Ireland
- UK Border Force
- Republic of Ireland–United Kingdom border
