= Companies Registration Office (Ireland) =

- Formation: 7 August 1862; 163 years ago
- Type: Government office
- Purpose: Registry of companies
- Headquarters: Bloom House; Gloucester Street Lower; PO Box 12858; Dublin 1
- Website: cro.ie

The Companies Registration Office (CRO; Irish: An Oifig um Chlárú Cuideachtaí) registers and incorporates companies in Ireland and files their annual returns. It is an office of the Department of Enterprise, Tourism and Employment.

The CRO has a number of core functions:

- The incorporation of companies.
- The receipt and registration of post incorporation documents.
- The enforcement of the Companies Acts in relation to the filing obligations of companies.
- Making information on companies available to the public.

It also registers the names of businesses which are non-limited trading entities such as sole traders and partnerships.

It also has the Office of the Registry of Friendly Societies which registers Industrial & Provident Societies, Friendly Societies and trade unions.

In 2019, the Register of Beneficial Ownership was introduced into Ireland. That was implemented on the back of the EU’s Fourth Anti-Money Laundering Directive, which essentially requires all member states to hold adequate, accurate and current information of all beneficial owners. A beneficial owner is someone who owns more than 25% of a company.

As of 2026, the CRO has offices on the corner of Gloucester Place Lower and Railway Street, Dublin and in Carlow.

== See also ==
- List of Irish companies
- List of company registers
