= Distressed securities =

Tradable investment whose subject is in distress, default, or bankruptcy

In corporate finance, distressed securities are securities over companies or government entities that are experiencing financial or operational distress, default, or are under bankruptcy. As far as debt securities, this is called distressed debt. Purchasing or holding such distressed-debt creates significant risk due to the possibility that bankruptcy may render such securities worthless (zero recovery).

The deliberate investment in distressed securities as a strategy, while potentially lucrative, has a significant level of risk as the securities may become worthless. To do so requires significant levels of resources and expertise to analyze each investment, the related going concern risk and assess its position in an issuer's capital structure along with the likelihood of ultimate recovery. Distressed securities tend to trade at substantial discounts to their intrinsic or par value and are therefore considered to be below investment grade. This usually limits the number of potential investors to large institutional investors—such as hedge funds, private equity firms, investment banks, and specialist investment firms such as vulture funds.

In 2012, Edward Altman, a professor emeritus at the NYU Stern School of Business, and an expert on bankruptcy theory, estimated that there were "more than 200 financial institutions investing between $350–400 billion in the distressed debt market in the United States".

== History ==
The market developed for distressed securities as the number of large public companies in financial distress increased in the 1980s and early 1990s. In 1992, professor Edward Altman, who developed the Altman Z-score formula for predicting bankruptcy in 1968, estimated "the market value of the debt securities" of distressed firms as "is approximately $20.5 billion, a $42.6 billion in face value". By 1993 the investment community had become increasingly interested in the potential market for distressed firms' debt. At that time distressed securities "yielded a minimum ten percent over comparable maturity of U.S. Treasury bonds... Adding private debt with public registration rights allows private bank debt and trade claims of defaulted and distressed companies to bring the total book value of defaulted and distressed securities to $284 billion, a market value of $177 billion."

== Investment strategy ==
The distressed securities investment strategy exploits the fact many investors are unable to hold securities that are below investment grade.

Some investors have deliberately used distressed debt as an alternative investment, where they buy the debt at a deep discount and aim to realize a high return if the company or country does not go bankrupt or experience defaults. The major buyers of distressed securities are typically large institutional investors, who have access to sophisticated risk management resources such as hedge funds, private equity firms and units of investment banks. Firms that specialize in investing in distressed debt are often referred to as vulture funds.

Investors in distressed securities often try to influence the process by which the issuer restructures its debt, narrows its focus, or implements a plan to turn around its operations. Investors may also invest new capital into a distressed company in the form of debt or equity. According to a 2006 report by Edward Altman, a professor of finance at the NYU Stern School of Business, distressed debt investments earned well above average returns in 2006 and there were more than 170 institutional distressed debt investors. These institutions used "very strong and varied strategies including the traditional passive buy-and-hold and arbitrage plays, direct lending to distressed companies, active-control elements, foreign investing, emerging equity purchases and equity plays during the reorganization of a firm in bankruptcy". The most common distressed securities are bonds and bank debt.

While there is no precise definition, fixed-income instruments with a yield to maturity in excess of 1,000 basis points over the risk-free rate of return (e.g., Treasuries) are commonly thought of as being distressed. Distressed securities often carry ratings of CCC or below from agencies such as Standard & Poor's, Moody's and Fitch.

== Risk management ==
By 2006, the increased popularity in distressed debt hedge funds led to an increase in the number of benchmark performance indexes. Highly specialized risk analysts and experts in credit are key to the success of alternative investments such as distressed debt investment. They depend on accurate market data from institutions such as CDX High Yield Index and India-based Gravitas, which combines risk management software with sophisticated risk analysis using advanced analytics and modeling. They produce customized scenarios that assess the risk impact of market events. Gravitas uses IBM Risk Analytics technology (formerly Algorithmics), which is also used by major banks, to help hedge funds meet regulatory requirements and optimize investment decisions.

When companies enter a period of financial distress, the original holders often sell the debt or equity securities of the issuer to a new set of buyers. Private investment partnerships such as hedge funds have been the largest buyers of distressed securities. By 2006, hedge funds have purchased more than 25% of the high-yield market's supply to supplement their more traditional defaulted debt purchases. By 2006, "new issues rated CCC to CCC− were at an all time high of $20.1 billion". Other buyers include brokerage firms, mutual funds, private equity firms and specialized debt funds such as collateralized loan obligations.

The United States has the most developed market for distressed securities. The international market, especially in Europe, has become more active in recent years as the amount of leveraged lending has increased, capital standards for banks have become more stringent, the accounting treatment of non-performing loans has been standardized, and insolvency laws have been modernized.

Typically, the investors in distressed securities must make an assessment not only of the issuer's ability to improve its operations, but also whether or not the restructuring process (which frequently requires court supervision) will benefit one class of securities more than another.

== Sovereign debt ==
In 2003, Seveq observed that the emergence of the secondary debt market led to a "modern sovereign debt litigation" and the creation of an industry of "professional suers of foreign states".

In a 2010 article, Blackman and Mukhi examined a series of litigations employed by distressed funds investors in their lawsuits against defaulted sovereign states. The business plan involved buying the sovereign debt instruments at a deep discount based on a very high risk, and then attempting to enforce the full claim. The strategy is most effective when the sovereign state lacks bankruptcy protection. These investors however are constrained by "the sovereign-immunity rules that national legislatures have enacted and national courts have elaborated" to protect the vulnerable nation states from litigation.

While private debtors have the resource of bankruptcy protection, sovereign states do not. There have been "sporadic calls for a bankruptcy analogue for sovereign states" similar to the bankruptcy process for private debtors, however these calls have lacked momentum. (Note: "When it becomes necessary for a state to declare itself bankrupt, in the same manner as when it becomes necessary for an individual to do so, a fair, open, and avowed bankruptcy is always the measure which is both the least dishonourable to the debtor, and least hurtful to the creditor." Adam Smith (1776))

According to the African Development Bank Group, at least twenty heavily indebted poor countries in Africa have been threatened with or subjected to legal actions by commercial creditors and hedge funds since 1999.

=== Zambia ===
In 1999, the US firm Donegal International purchased $40 million of Zambian debt owed to Romania for the "discounted purchase price" of $3.2 million. In 2007, a British high court granted the company "permission to enforce a claim for tens of millions of dollars against the Government of Zambia".

=== Liberia ===
In 2009, a British court awarded $20 million to hedge funds suing Liberia. Before the hedge funds could collect their money, the Debt Relief (Developing Countries) Act 2010 was passed in the UK parliament in 2010 after Liberian president and 2011 Nobel Peace Prize winner Ellen Johnson Sirleaf appeared on the BBC Newsnight program for the hedge funds to "have a conscience and give this country a break".

That act caps what the hedge funds can collect, they had to settle with Liberia for just over $1 million, and effectively prevents them suing for exorbitant amounts of money in United Kingdom courts. Nick Dearden of the Jubilee Debt Campaign said of the change, "It will mean the poorest countries in the world can no longer be attacked by these reprehensible investment funds who grow fat from the misery of others". The law was made permanent in 2011 but there are still havens for this activity, such as the Channel Islands and the British Virgin Islands.

=== Congo ===
FG Hemisphere of Brooklyn, sued Democratic Republic of the Congo for a debt from Yugoslavia in the 1970s, which it had picked up for $3.3 million. FG sued in Hong Kong, Australia, and Jersey, which was not covered by the UK law against hedge funds involved in sovereign debt. The Chinese government blocked the attempt to sue in Hong Kong but the Jersey court awarded $100 million to FG. A series of attempts were then made in Britain and the United States by organizations such as Jubilee USA Network, Oxfam and the Jubilee Debt Campaign to change the laws so that hedge funds would not be able to collect on their awards. The Jubilee Debt Coalition's Tim Jones traveled to Jersey in November 2011 to ask the government to ban hedge funds involved in sovereign debt. He told The Guardian that the Democratic Republic of the Congo "desperately needs to be able to use its rich resources to alleviate poverty, not squander them on paying unjust debts".

When FG's owner Peter Grossman was doorstepped by freelance reporter Greg Palast and asked whether he thought it was fair to take $100 million for a debt he had paid $3 million for, he responded, "Yeah I do actually…I'm not beating up the Congo. I'm collecting on a legitimate claim".

FG Hemisphere is attempting to enforce an ICC arbitration award for $116 million owed by the Democratic Republic of the Congo. The award was originally issued by an arbitral panel of the International Chamber of Commerce (ICC) in favor of Energoinvest DD of Bosnia in the amount of $39 million and then sold to FG Hemisphere. The award had been issued by the ICC in respect of unpaid construction contracts pursuant to which Energoinvest supervised construction of high-tension power lines, which are still in service, for transmission of power from the Inga–Shaba dam in the Congo—then known as Zaire.

=== Peru ===
In 1983, Peru was in economic distress and had large amounts of external debt. In 1996, the nation restructured its debts. The original loans were exchanged for Brady Bonds, dollar-denominated bonds issued in the original amount of the loans. Paul Singer's Elliott Associates, a New York-based hedge fund, purchased $20.7 million worth of defaulted loans made to Peru for a discounted price of $11.4 million. Elliott Associates, holding the only portion of Peru's debt remaining outside the restructure, sued Peru and won a $58 million settlement. Unable to pay the $58 million, Peru, continued to repay creditors that held Brady Bonds. Elliott filed an injunction to prevent Peru from paying off its restructured debt without also paying Elliott. It was argued that Peru violated the "pari passu" clause, which states that no creditor can be given preferential treatment.

=== Argentina ===
In 2001, Argentina defaulted on roughly $81 billion. NML Capital, LTD., a hedge fund that is a subsidiary of Elliott Management Corporation, purchased Argentine debt on a secondary market for a lower price. Ninety-two percent of creditors restructured in 2005 and 2010 for roughly $0.30 on the dollar. NML Capital rejected the proposal and sued Argentina for the full amount in New York State courts. NML Capital's main argument is that the "pari passu"—Latin for "on equal footing"—clause in the original contract requires Argentina to pay back all of its creditors, including those who did not agree to restructure, if it paid back one creditor. Since Argentina had already begun to repay the creditors that restructured, Elliot argued that it also deserved to be paid back.

On October 2, 2012, NML Capital Ltd., a hedge fund based in the Cayman Islands, which held Argentine debt not included in Argentine debt restructuring, impounded the Libertad, an Argentine Navy training ship in Tema, Ghana. The Ghanaian court held that Argentina had waived sovereign immunity when it contracted the sovereign debt being enforced.

In November 2012, the New York State Court ruled in favor of Elliot and the other holdouts on the merits of the pari passu argument, and ordered Argentina to pay $1.3 billion on December 15—the very same date that Argentina was supposed to pay the creditors who had agreed to the restructure. An appeals court heard oral arguments on February 27, and in June 2014, the U.S. Supreme Court rejected Argentina's appeal. The Center for Economic and Policy Research reported on an Organization of American States special meeting on July 3, 2014, among foreign ministry officials, in Washington, D.C., to discuss the situation. The resolution was passed with the support of all OAS member states other than the United States and Canada.

In July 2014, a U.S. federal judge ruled in favor of NML Capital Ltd., a unit of Michael Sheehan's Elliott Management, against Argentina. The country owes its creditors more than $1.3 billion. According to Mark Weidemaier, a law professor at the University of North Carolina, the ruling was one of "the most significant litigation victories that a holdout creditor has ever achieved" in the realm of sovereign debt. A July 2014 article in The Wall Street Journal by Georgetown Law professor Adam J. Levitin argued that the relationship between distressed securities investors and the U.S. court system should be revisited. He claimed that while these distressed debt investment funds can choose to "play the game" and "put their head in the mouth of the Leviathan", the U.S. courts should not choose to.

== See also ==
- Business valuation § Option pricing approaches
- Credit risk
- Default (finance)
- High-yield debt
- Private equity
- Financial statements
- Traditional investments
- Vulture fund
