= George Tidmarsh =

American politician and businessman (born 1960)

Director of U.S. Center for Drug Evaluation and Research
- In office July 21, 2025 – November 2, 2025
- President: Donald Trump
- Preceded by: Jacqueline Corrigan-Curay
- Succeeded by: Richard Pazdur

temporary Director of U.S. Center for Biologics Evaluation and Research
- In office July 31, 2025 – August 9, 2025
- President: Donald Trump
- Preceded by: Vinay Prasad
- Succeeded by: Vinay Prasad

Personal details
- Born: 1960 (age 65–66) Oak Park, Illinois, U.S.
- Education: Stanford University

George Tidmarsh (born 1960) is an American politician and businessman who served as the Director of U.S. Center for Drug Evaluation and Research from July to November 2025. He was also the temporary Director of U.S. Center for Biologics Evaluation and Research after Vinay Prasad resigned, until Prasad returned 10 days later.

== Education ==
Tidmarsh attended Stanford University for his undergraduate degree and subsequently MD and PhD in Cancer Biology.

== Career ==
Prior to taking a role in the second Trump administration, Tidmarsh was described as a serial entrepreneur, serving as a founder and executive of several biotech companies. This included bringing Duexis to market as founder and CEO of Horizon Therapeutics, and a subsequent term as CEO of La Jolla Pharmaceutical Company when the company received FDA approval for Giapreza.

He was also an adjunct professor at Stanford University School of Medicine and founded a master's degree program in translational research and applied medicine.

== Controversy ==
Tidmarsh was placed on administrative leave from the CDER in October 2025 by Marty Makary after accusations of abusing his regulatory authority. A suit was also filed against him by Aurinia Pharmaceuticals claiming Tidmarsh misused his authority to target a business of a former associate, and publicly questioning the previous FDA approval of its drug voclosporin. On November 2, 2025 Tidmarsh officially resigned from the directorship of the CDER, stating he left to protest the handling of drug reviews at the FDA.
