= Horizon Therapeutics =

Irish tax-registered pharmaceutical

Horizon Therapeutics plc
- Formerly: Horizon Pharma plc
- Type: Subsidiary
- Traded as: Nasdaq: HZNP
- Industry: Pharmaceutical
- Founded: 2005; 21 years ago
- Headquarters: (Legal) Dublin, Ireland; (Operational) Lake Forest (Chicago), Illinois, U.S.
- Key people: Timothy P. Walbert (chairman, president & CEO) Paul W. Hoelscher (CFO); Andy Pasternak (CBO) Jeffrey W. Sherman, M.D. (CMO)
- Revenue: ▲US$3.63 billion (2022)
- Operating income: ▲US$617 million (2022)
- Net income: ▼US$521 million (2022)
- Total assets: ▲US$9.11 billion (2022)
- Total equity: ▲US$5.07 billion (2022)
- Number of employees: 2,115 (2022)
- Parent: Amgen
- Website: horizontherapeutics.com

Horizon Therapeutics plc was a biopharmaceutical company focused on researching, developing, and commercializing medicines that address critical needs for people impacted by rare and rheumatic diseases. Horizon primarily markets products in the United States, which represented 97% of Horizon's 2019 worldwide sales. Amgen acquired the company in October 2023.

== History ==
Horizon Therapeutics was founded in 2005 in Illinois focused on the development of Duexa, a formulation of ibuprofen combined with famotidine. Nitec Pharma AG was founded in Switzerland in 2004 as a spin-off from Merck KGaA. In 2010, Horizon and Nitec merged to form a combined company Horizon Pharma Inc. to be led by Timothy Walbert to support the launch of Lodotra and Duexa. Horizon IPOed in 2011 raising $49.5 million.

In 2014, Horizon executed a tax inversion to move its legal headquarters to Ireland to avail itself of Ireland's low tax rates and beneficial corporate tax system.

In October 2014, the company acquired the US sales and marketing rights to the osteoarthritis drug Pennsaid from Nuvo Research for $45 million. In March 2015, the company acquired Hyperion Therapeutics for $1.1 billion, increasing Horizon's orphan disease drug portfolio. In December, the company acquired Crealta Holdings for $510 million. In September 2016, the company announced the acquisition of Raptor Pharmaceutical for $800 million, adding Procysbi and Quinsair to its rare drug portfolio. In 2017, Horizon announced its intention to acquire River Vision Development Corp for $145 million and to continue the development of teprotumumab.

On May 2, 2019, shareholders of the company approved the change of the company's name from Horizon Pharma plc to Horizon Therapeutics plc. In January 2020 – after showing very strong PhIII data – it was approved for the treatment of thyroid eye disease (TED), a rare vision-threatening disease that previously had no FDA-approved treatment options. Horizon believed it could reach $1 billion peak sales in the US alone.

In February 2021, the business announced it would acquire Viela Bio Inc for around $3 billion ($53 per share).

In December 2022, the company announced it would be acquired by Amgen for $27.8 billion ($116.50 in cash for each Horizon share, a 20% premium). The company was reportedly the center of a bidding war between Amgen, Johnson & Johnson and Sanofi. In May 2023, the Federal Trade Commission said it would sue to block the deal in an attempt to control drug prices. The acquisition was completed in October 2023 after mutually resolving the litigation.

Horizon Therapeutics sales by region (2017)
Region	Sales ($ m)	Distribution (%)
U.S.	1,026.527	97
Rest of World	29.704	3
Total	1,056.231	100

== Activity ==
The company has cooperated with American Gastroenterological Association (AGA) Institute to launch a program named "Connect to Protect" which aims to help physicians and patients better understand non-steroidal anti-inflammatory drug (NSAID) risks. The program is planned to promote communications between physicians and patients about NSAIDs and gastrointestinal ulcers.

In 2016, the company became a member of the Pharmaceutical Research and Manufacturers of America (PhRMA).

== Operations and locations ==
In March 2014, the company executed a corporate tax inversion to Ireland by acquiring Irish–based Vidara Therapeutics International for $660 million. While Horizon's main operations and sales remained in the U.S., Horizon moved their "legal" headquarters to Ireland to avoid U.S. taxes. In July 2015, the Wall Street Journal noted that Horizon were using their lower Irish corporate tax rate to acquire further U.S.–based life sciences firms (i.e. Horizon could afford to pay more).

In early 2022, the company signed a lease on a large research and development facility in Rockville, Maryland.

It is also expanding its development and manufacturing facility in Waterford (Ireland) for the production of rare disease biologics and drugs still in development.

== Therapeutic areas ==
Horizon's drug portfolio is focused on treatments for thyroid eye disease (TED), gout, rare diseases, and inflammatory diseases. Horizon's portfolio includes Tepezza (teprotumumab), Krystexxa (pegloticase), Actimmune (interferon gamma), Duexis (ibuprofen + famotidine), Pennsaid (diclofenac, 2% topical), Rayos/Lodotra (prednisone), Vimovo (naproxen/esomeprazole magnesium), Buphenyl (sodium phenylbutyrate), Procysbi (cysteamine bitartrate), and Ravicti (glycerol phenylbutyrate).

== Products ==
The company's lead product base includes Krystexxa, Duexis and Rayos. Outside the United States, Rayos is also known as Lodotra.

== See also ==
- Corporate tax inversions
- Ireland as a tax haven
