= Corporation tax in the Republic of Ireland =

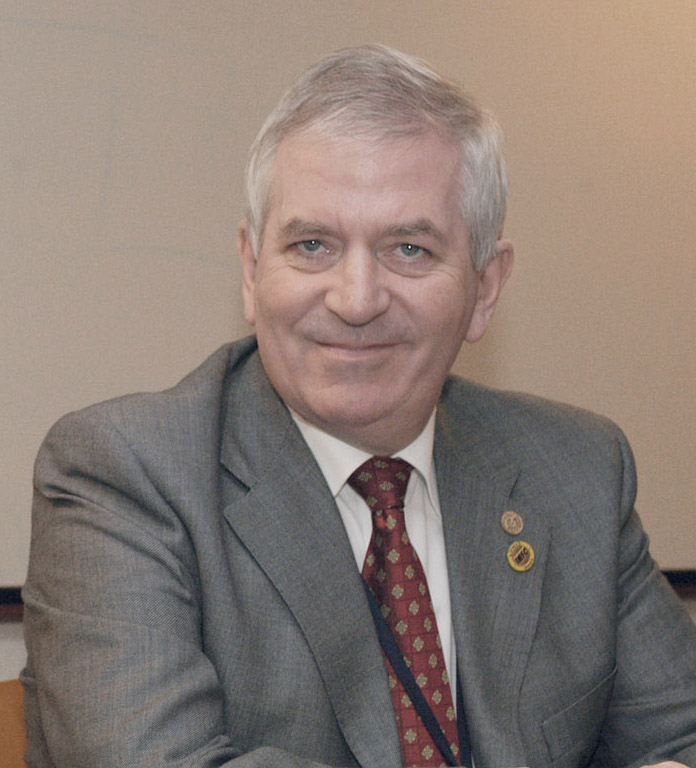
Former Finance Minister, Charlie McCreevy, reduced Irish corporate tax from 32% to 12.5% in the 1999 Finance Act, and his 1997 Tax and Consolidation Act laid the framework for Ireland's BEPS tax tools.

Ireland's Corporate Tax System is a central component of Ireland's economy. In 2016–17, foreign firms paid 80% of Irish corporate tax, employed 25% of the Irish labour force (paid 50% of Irish salary tax), and created 57% of Irish OECD non-farm value-add. As of 2017, 25 of the top 50 Irish firms were U.S.–controlled businesses, representing 70% of the revenue of the top 50 Irish firms. By 2018, Ireland had received the most U.S. § Corporate tax inversions in history, and Apple was over one–fifth of Irish GDP. Academics rank Ireland as the largest tax haven; larger than the Caribbean tax haven system. (Note: The OECD does not class Ireland as a tax haven, and as of 2018, only considers Trinidad and Tobago as a tax haven (see Ireland as a tax haven))

Ireland's "headline" corporation tax rate is 12.5%, however, foreign multinationals pay an aggregate § Effective tax rate (ETR) of 2.2–4.5% on global profits "shifted" to Ireland, via Ireland's global network of bilateral tax treaties. These lower effective tax rates are achieved by a complex set of Irish base erosion and profit shifting ("BEPS") tools which handle the largest BEPS flows in the world (e.g. the Double Irish as used by Google and Facebook, the Single Malt as used by Microsoft and Allergan, and Capital Allowances for Intangible Assets as used by Accenture, and by Apple post Q1 2015).

Ireland's main § Multinational tax schemes use "intellectual property" ("IP") accounting to affect the BEPS movement, which is why almost all foreign multinationals in Ireland are from the industries with substantial IP, namely technology and life sciences.

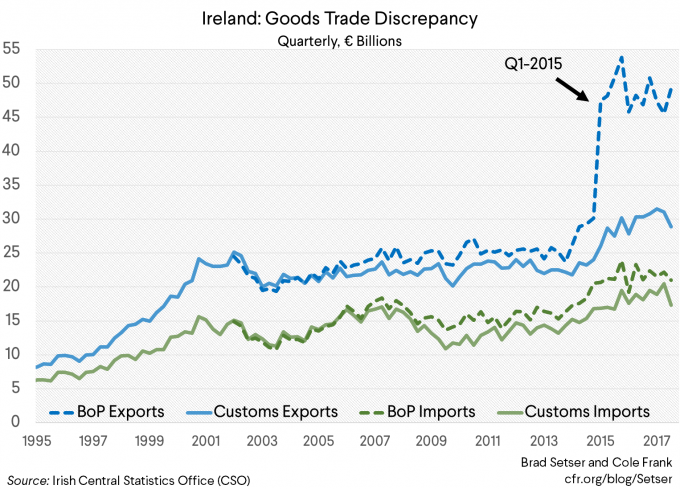
The Q1 2015 restructuring of Apple's non-U.S. IP to Apple (Ireland) was the largest BEPS action in history. Brad Setser & Cole Frank (CoFR).

Ireland's GDP is artificially inflated by BEPS accounting flows. This distortion escalated in Q1 2015 when Apple executed the largest BEPS transaction in history, on-shoring $300 billion of non–U.S. IP to Ireland (resulting in a phenomenon dubbed by some as "leprechaun economics"). In 2017, it forced the Central Bank of Ireland to supplement GDP with an alternative measure, modified gross national income (GNI*), which removes some of the distortions by BEPS tools. Irish GDP was 162% of Irish GNI* in 2017. (Note: In contrast, EU–28 2017 GDP was 100% of EU–28 2017 GNI.)

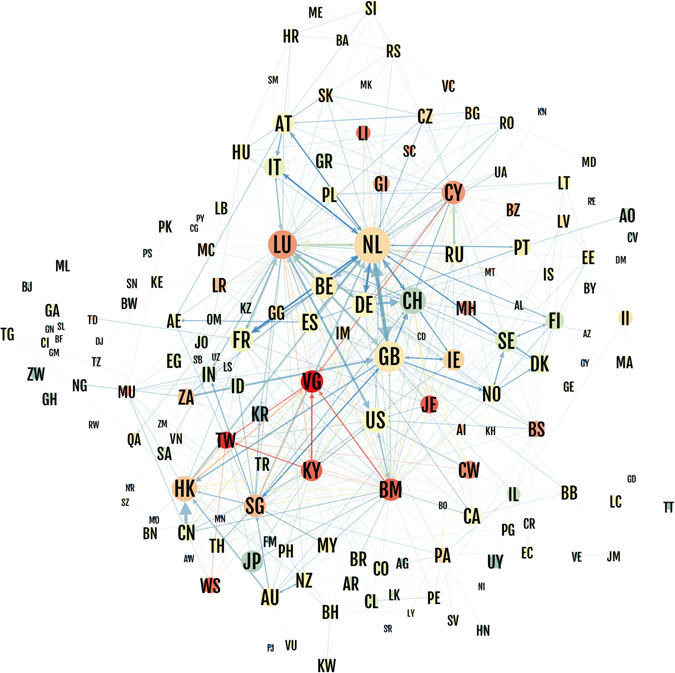
Ireland is ranked as one of the largest global Conduit OFCs in terms of connections to corporate tax havens, the largest global Tax Haven in terms of quantum of profits shielded, and the 3rd-largest global Shadow Banking OFC.

Ireland's corporation tax regime is integrated with Ireland's IFSC tax schemes (e.g. Section 110 SPVs and QIAIFs), which give confidential routes out of the Irish corporate tax system to Sink OFC's in Luxembourg. This functionality has made Ireland one of the largest global Conduit OFCs, and the third largest global Shadow Banking OFC.

As a countermeasure to potential exploits by U.S. companies, the U.S. Tax Cuts and Jobs Act of 2017 (TCJA) moves the U.S. to a "territorial tax" system. The TJCA's GILTI–FDII–BEAT tax regime has seen U.S. IP–heavy multinationals (e.g. Pfizer), forecast 2019 effective tax rates that are similar to those of prior U.S. tax inversions to Ireland (e.g. Medtronic). Companies taking advantage of Ireland's corporate tax regime are also threatened by the EU's desire to introduce EU–wide anti-BEPS tool regimes (e.g. the 2020 Digital Services Tax, and the CCCTB).

== Tax system ==
=== Tax rates ===
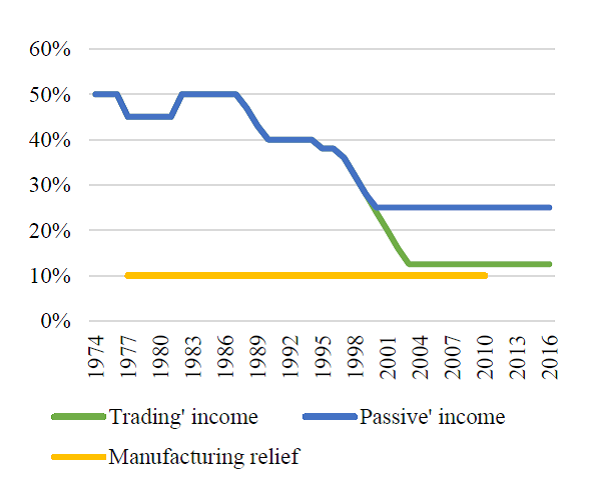
Irish corporate tax rates (1974 to 2016). Source: Revenue.

As of November 2018, there are two rates of corporation tax ("CT") in Ireland:

- a 12.5% headline rate (Note: In Effective Tax Rates it is shown that Ireland's CT tax rate is between 0% and 2.5% depending on what particular Irish BEPS tools are used. Effective Tax Rates also shows that the aggregate CT tax rate in Ireland is between 2.2% and 4.5% depending on various assumptions.) for trading income (or "active businesses income" in the Irish tax code); trading relates to conducting a business, not investment trading;
- a 25.0% headline rate (Note: Ireland offers specific Central Bank of Ireland–regulated SPVs that foreign investors in passive Irish income can use avoid the 25% rate (and all other Irish taxes and duties), on Irish assets. The main vehicles are the Irish QIAIF and the Irish Section 110 SPV. Public tax scandals in Ireland in 2016, revealed because Irish Section 110 SPVs have to file Irish public accounts, led to the Central Bank of Ireland to introduce the L–QIAIF vehicle to replace the Section 110 SPV for foreign investors who want to avoid the 25% passive income tax in a confidential manner. QIAIFs and L–QIAIFs do not have to file Irish public accounts; instead filing confidential accounts with the Central Bank of Ireland which are protected under the Central Bank Secrecy Act of 1942.) for non-trading income (or also called passive income in the Irish tax code); covering investment income (e.g. income from buying and selling assets), rental income from real estate, net profits from foreign trades, and income from certain land dealings and income from oil, gas and mineral exploitations in Ireland.
- The 10% manufacturing relief tax scheme ended in 2010 (see graphic).

=== Key aspects ===
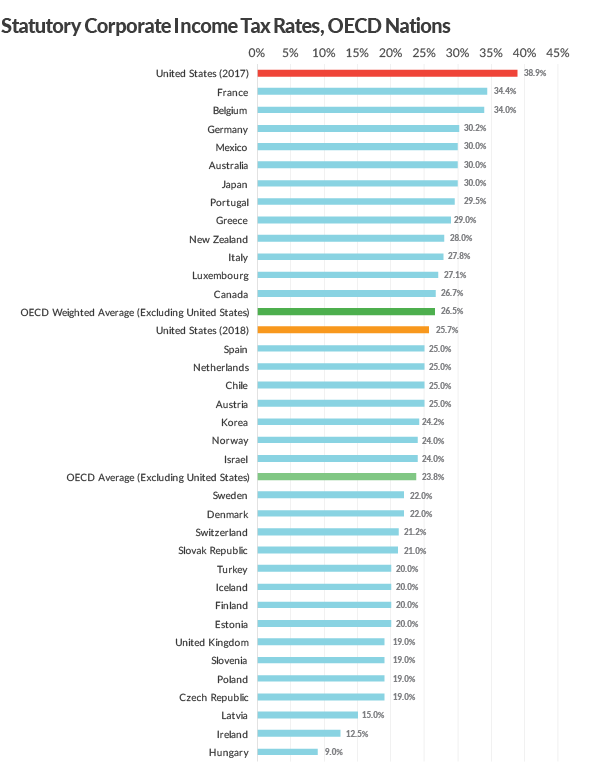
2018 headline corporate tax rates for all 35 OECD members (pre and post the 2017 U.S. TCJA)

As of November 2018, the key attributes that tax experts note regarding the Irish corporate tax system are as follows:

- Low headline rate. At 12.5%, Ireland has one of the lowest headline tax rates in Europe (Hungary 9% and Bulgaria 10% are lower); OECD average is 24.9%.
- Transparent. Many of Ireland's corporation tax tools are OECD–whitelisted, and Ireland has one of the lowest secrecy scores in the 2018 FSI rankings.
- "Worldwide tax". Ireland is one of six remaining countries that use a "worldwide tax" system (Chile, Greece, Ireland, Israel, South Korea, Mexico).
- No "thin capitalisation". Ireland has no thin capitalisation rules, which means that Irish corporates can be financed with 100% debt, and 0% equity.
- Double Irish residency. Before 2015, Irish CT was based where a company was "managed and controlled" versus registered; the "Double Irish" ends in 2020.
- Single Malt residency. Post closure of the Double Irish to new entrants in 2015, it can be recreated by wordings in selective tax treaties (e.g. Malta and UAE).
- Extensive treaties. As of March 2018, Ireland has bilateral tax treaties with 73 countries (the 74th, Ghana, is pending).
- Holding company regime. Built for tax inversions, it gives Irish–based holding companies tax relief on withholding taxes, foreign dividends and CGT.
- Intellectual property regime. Built for the BEPS tools of U.S. technology and life sciences firms, recognises a wide range of intellectual assets that can be charged against Irish tax; the CAIA arrangement.
- Knowledge Development Box. Ireland created the first OECD–compliant KDB in 2016 to support its IP–based BEPS tools.

=== Yearly returns (2001–2019) ===
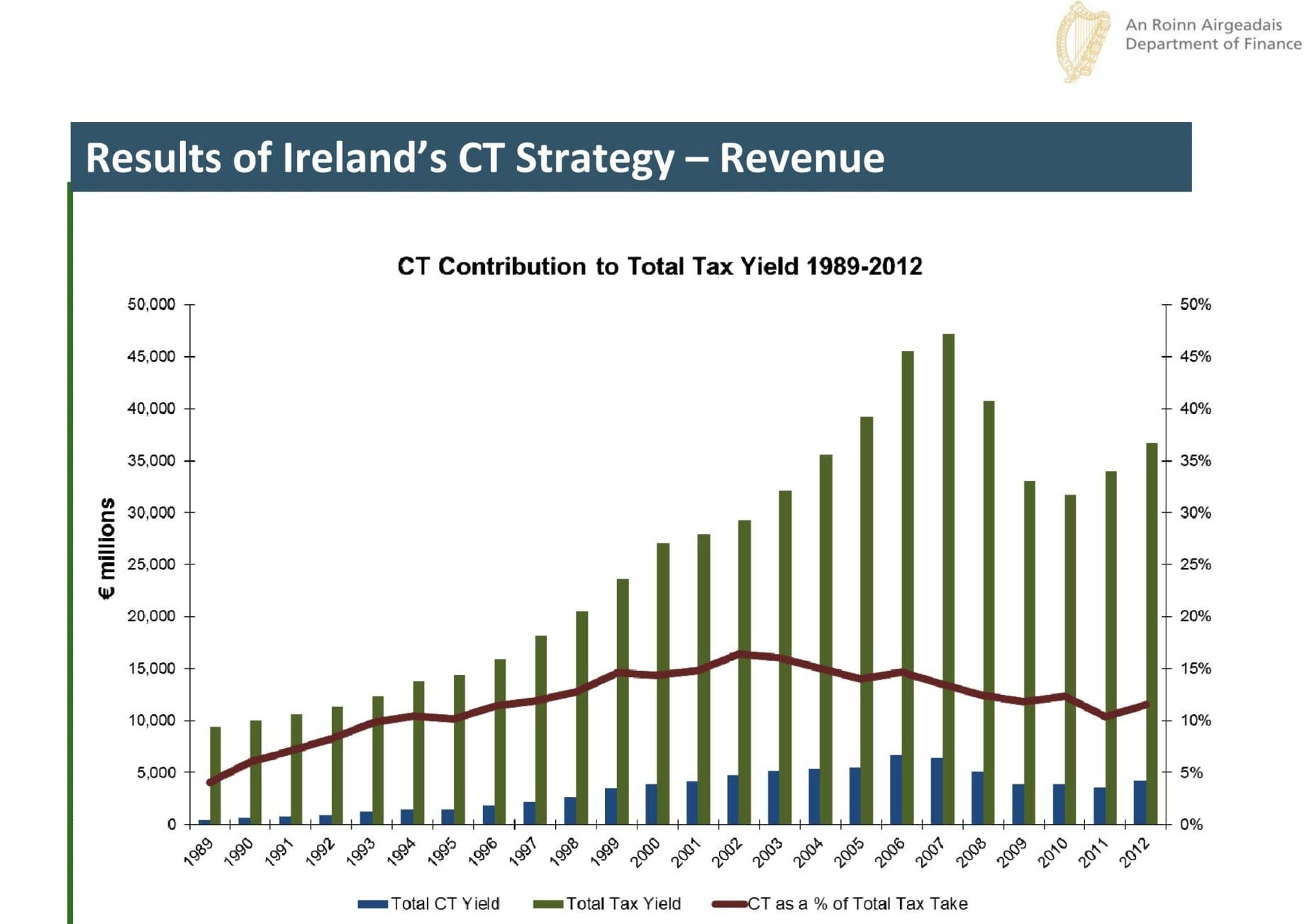
Irish Corporation Tax as a % Irish Exchequer Tax has between 10% and 16% of Total Irish Tax. Source: Department of Finance (Ireland)

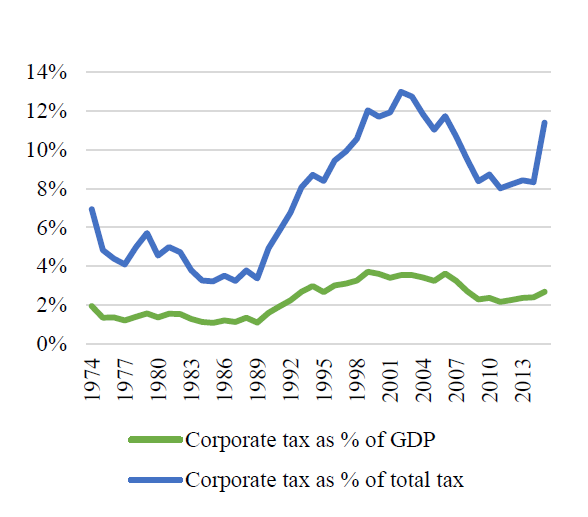
Irish Corporation Tax as % of Irish GDP, and as % of Total Irish Gross (Note: Most of the OECD's Taxation Statistics use Gross Tax Revenues, which are Exchequer Tax Revenues (ETR) to which are addedSocial Security Contributions (also called PRSI in Ireland), and other Appropriations-in-Aid ("A–in–A") items. As 2017 Irish PRSI is circa 20% of ETR, the differences are material.) Tax (1974 to 2016). Source: OECD.

The trends in Irish corporation tax ("CT") receipts to the Irish Exchequer were:

- Foreign firms pay 80% of Irish CT Revenue (notwithstanding that large U.S.–controlled tax inversions to Ireland, are classed as Irish firms).
- Irish CT Revenues jump in 2015, the year of Apple's re-structure of its BEPS tools.
- Since Apple's 2015 re-structure, Irish CT Revenue as a % of Total Irish Exchequer Tax Revenue is at its pre-crisis peak of over 16% (OECD average is 7.5%);
- Irish CT Revenue has been 10 to 16% of Total Irish Exchequer Tax Revenue (see graphic).
- The concentration of the Top 10 Irish CT Payers has risen post the crisis, despite the fact that Irish banks stopped paying Irish CT due to accumulated losses.

Table 3: Irish Corporation Tax (CT) Revenues: 2001–2019 (€ billion)
Calendar Year	Net Corporation Tax Revenue (1)	Total Exchequer Tax Revenue (2)	(1) as % of (2)	Top 10 Payer as % of Net CT	Foreign Payer as % of Net CT	Reference
2001	4.16	27.93	14.9%	—	—	(restated)
2002	4.80	29.29	16.4%	—	—	
2003	5.16	32.10	16.1%	—	—	
2004	5.33	35.58	15.0%	—	—	
2005	5.49	39.25	14.0%	—	—	
2006	6.68	45.54	14.7%	17%	—	
2007	6.39	47.25	13.5%	16%	—	
2008	5.07	40.78	12.4%	18%	—	
2009	3.90	33.04	11.8%	35%	—	
2010	3.92	31.75	12.4%	32%	circa 80%	
2011	3.52	34.02	10.3%	39%	circa 80%	
2012	4.22	36.65	11.5%	34%	circa 80%	
2013	4.27	37.81	11.3%	36%	circa 80%	
2014	4.61	41.28	11.2%	37%	circa 80%	
2015	6.87	45.13	15.2%	41%	circa 80%	
2016	7.35	49.02	15.0%	37%	circa 80%	
2017	8.20	50.74	16.2%	39%	circa 80%	
2018	10.4	54.74	19%	45%	77%	
2019	10.9	57.37	19%	40%	77%	
2020	11.83	56.33	21%	51%	82%	
2021	15.232	67.4	22.6%	53%	89%	
2022	22.645	82.345	27.5%	57%	86.5%	
2023	23.842	88.303	27%	52%	83.8%	

Most recent peak in the statistic

=== Structure of Irish taxation ===
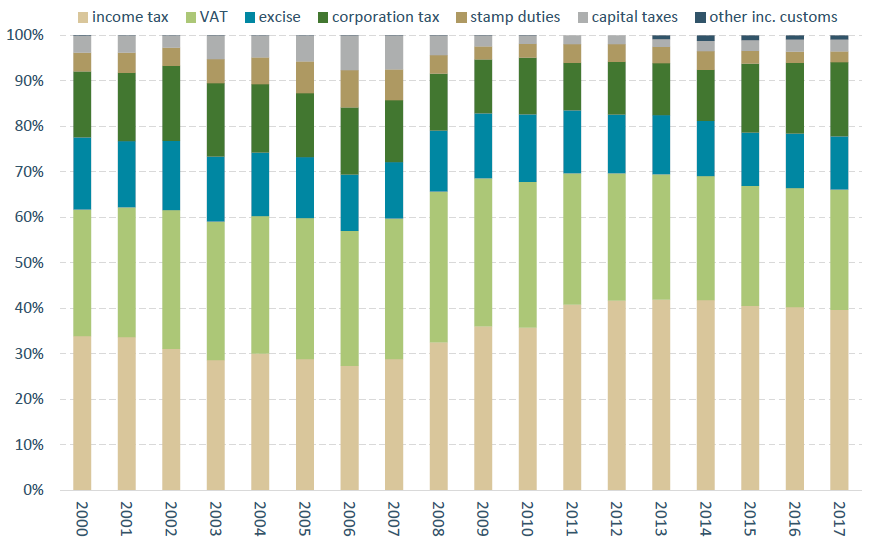
Distribution of Irish Exchequer Tax Revenues

Each year, the Department of Finance is required to produce a report on Estimates for Receipts and Expenditure for the coming year. The table below, is extracted from the "Tax Revenues" section of the report for the prior-year (e.g. the 2017 column is from the 2018 report), by which time the "Tax Revenues" for that year are largely known (although still subject to further revision in later years).

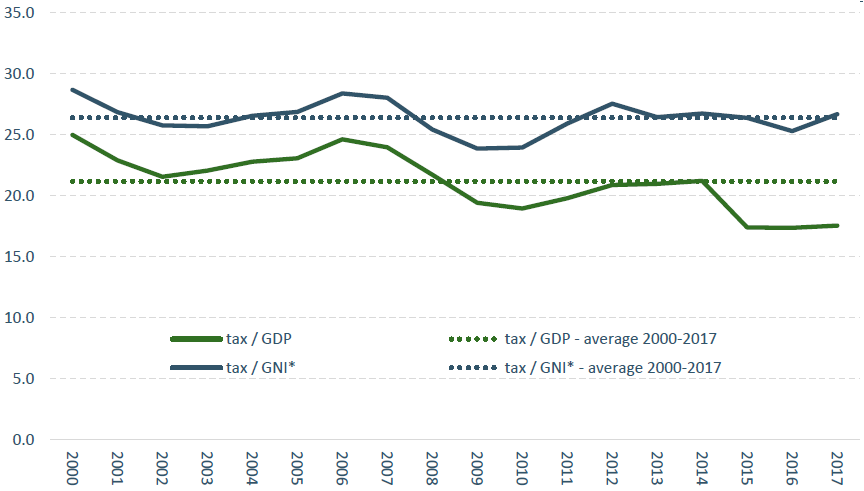
Irish Exchequer Tax Revenues as % of GDP / GNI*

The "Tax Revenues" quoted are Exchequer Tax Revenues, and do not include Appropriations-in-Aid ("A–in–A") items, the largest being Social Security (or PRSI) which for 2015 was €10.2 billion, and other smaller items. Irish Personal Income tax, and the two main Irish consumption taxes of VAT and Excise, have consistently been circa 80% of the total Irish Exchequer Tax Revenue, with the balance being Corporate tax.

Table 4: Distribution of Irish Exchequer Tax Revenues.
Category	Amount (€ m)				Distribution (%)			
Category	2014	2015	2016	2017	2014	2015	2016	2017
Customs	260	355	330	335	1%	1%	1%	1%
Excise Duty	5,080	5,245	5,645	5,735	12%	12%	12%	11%
Capital Gains Tax (CGT)	400	555	695	795	1%	1%	1%	2%
Capital Acquisitions Tax (CAT)	330	370	455	450	1%	1%	1%	1%
Stamp Duties	1,675	1,320	1,220	1,200	4%	3%	3%	2%
Income Tax (PAYE)	17,181	18,199	19,184	20,245	42%	41%	40%	40%
Corporation Tax (CT)	4,525	6,130	7,515	7,965	11%	14%	16%	16%
Value-Added Tax (VAT)	11,070	12,025	12,630	13,425	27%	27%	26%	27%
Local Property Tax (LPT)	520	438	460	470	1%	1%	1%	1%
Total Exchequer Tax Revenue	41,041	44,637	48,134	50,620	100%	100%	100%	100%

== Low tax economy ==
=== Transition in 1987 ===
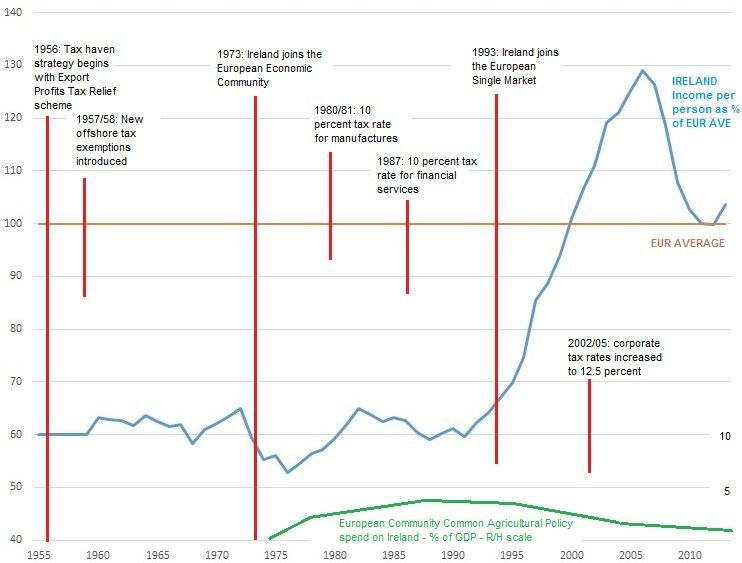
Effect of Ireland's Corporate Tax system on Ireland's relative GNI-per-capita to the EU average

Ireland's economic model was transformed from a predominantly agricultural-based economy to a knowledge-based economy, when the EU agreed to waive EU State-aid rules to allow Ireland's 'special rate' of 10% for manufacturing (created in 1980–81 with the EU's agreement), to be extended to the special economic zone called the International Financial Services Centre (IFSC) in Dublin city centre in 1987. The transformation was accelerated when Ireland's standard corporate tax rate was reduced from 40% to 12.5% (phased in from 1996 to 2003), in response to the EU's 1996–1998 decision to withdraw the State-aid waiver. The passing of the 1997 Taxes and Consolidated Acts laid the legal foundations for the base erosion and profit shifting (BEPS) tools used by U.S. multinationals in Ireland (e.g. the Double Irish, the Capital Allowances for Intangible Assets and the Section 110 SPV), to achieve an effective Irish CT rate, or ETR, of 0–2.5%.

While low CT rates (and even lower effective tax rates), are a central part of Irish tax policy, non–CT Taxation in the Republic of Ireland is closer to EU–28 and OECD averages. (Note: However, only when Irish Modified gross national income (or GNI*) is used for comparison, rather than Irish GDP which is artificially inflated and distorted by BEPS flows. See #Distortion of GDP) Ireland's policy is summarised by the OECD's Hierarchy of Taxes pyramid (reproduced in the Department of Finance Tax Strategy Group's 2011 corporate tax policy document). As shown in § Yearly returns (2001–2019), annual Irish CT has been between 10 and 16 percent of annual Total Irish Tax from circa 1994 to 2018. From 2000 to 2014, Ireland's Total Tax-to-GDP ratio was circa 27–30%, versus the OECD average of 33%. However, since Apple's Irish restructuring artificially inflated Ireland's GDP by 34.3% in 2015, Ireland's Tax-to-GDP ratio had fallen to the bottom of the OECD range at under 23%.

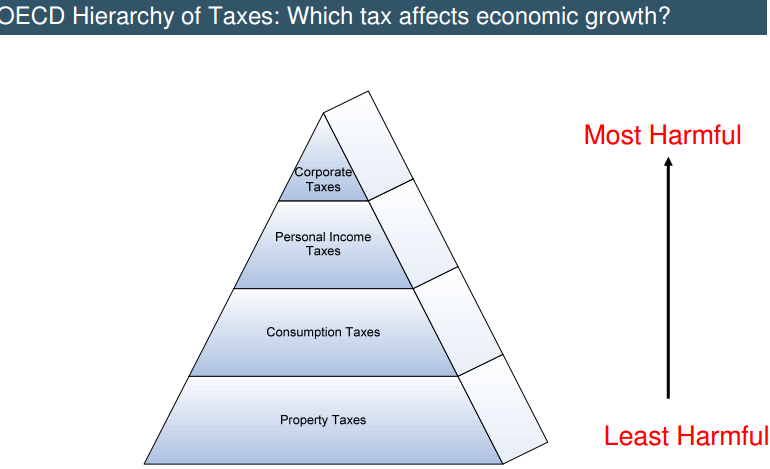
Recreation of the OECD "Hierarchy of Taxes" used by Ireland

In June 2018, tax academics estimated that Ireland was the largest global tax haven, exceeding the combined flows of the entire Caribbean tax haven system. Tax academics have also showed that being a corporate tax haven has been a prosperous economy strategy for Ireland, and most other havens. However, research also showed that the artificial distortion of Ireland's economic data, and GDP in particular, by BEPS flows, led to a large credit bubble during 2003–2007 (due to the mispricing of Ireland's credit by international markets), and an eventual credit–property–banking crisis in 2008–2013 (when Ireland's credit was re-priced).

Ireland's main foreign multinationals are from periods when their home jurisdiction had a "worldwide tax" system (see Table 1), and since the UK switched to a "territorial tax" system in 2009–12, Ireland has been almost exclusively a U.S. corporate–tax haven (see Table 1). In October 2014, The Guardian quoted Bono, the lead singer of Ireland's U2, as saying that "his country's tax policies have "brought our country the only prosperity we've known"". In April 2016, award-winning Irish writer, Fintan O'Toole labelled Ireland's focus on being a U.S. corporate tax haven as the core economic model, as Ireland's OBI, (or "One Big Idea").

=== Multinational economy ===
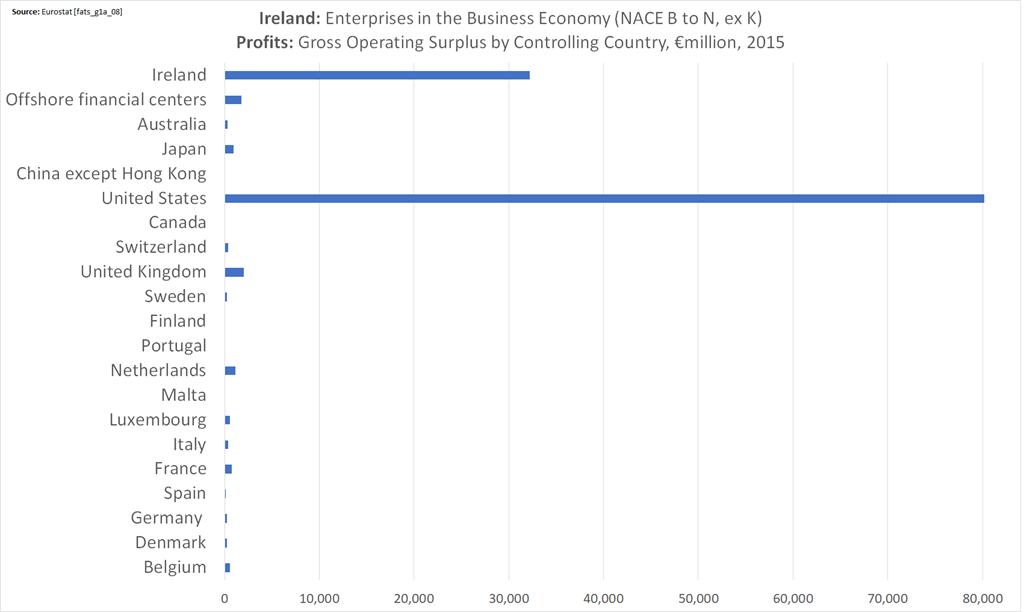
Dominance of U.S. firms. Irish corporate Gross Operating Surplus (i.e. profits), by the controlling country of the company (note: a material part of the Irish figure is also from U.S. tax inversions who are U.S.–controlled). Eurostat (2015).

U.S.–controlled multinationals, either legally based in the U.S. or legally based in Ireland (e.g. tax inversions), dominate Ireland's economy. In June 2018, the American Chamber of Commerce (Ireland) estimated the value of U.S. investment in Ireland was €334 billion, which compared to 2017 Irish GNI* of €181.2 billion. In January 2018, Eurostat used 2015 data to show the gross operating surplus of foreign companies in Ireland was almost exclusively from U.S. companies, with the UK was a distant second, and little other foreign firm activity.

In 2016–2017, foreign multinationals, being entirely U.S.–controlled:

- Directly employed one–quarter of the Irish private sector workforce;
- Paid an average wage of €85k (€17.9bn wage roll on 210,443 staff) versus the Irish Industrial wage of €35k;
- Directly contributed €28.3 billion annually in taxes, wages and capital spending;
- Paid 80% of all Irish corporation and Irish business taxes;
- Paid 50% of all Irish salary taxes (due to higher paying jobs), 50% of all Irish VAT, and 92% of all Irish customs and excise duties; (Note: These figures were stated by Suzanne Kelly, a leading Irish tax expert and tax barrister, and the Past President of the Irish Tax Institute; but they are not fully verifiable from public sources.)
- Created 57% of private sector non–farm value–add: 40% of value–add in Irish services and 80% of value–add in Irish manufacturing;
- Made up 25 of the top 50 Irish companies (by 2017 turnover) (see Table 1).

=== Multinational features ===
The main features regarding foreign multinationals in Ireland are:

- They are almost exclusively U.S. U.S.–controlled multinationals are 25 of the top 50 firms in Ireland, and 70% of top 50 firm revenue (see Table 1). This includes U.S. multinationals that are legally headquartered in Ireland (e.g. Medtronic), but who are run from the U.S. (e.g. all senior executives and the main offices are in the U.S.).
- They are from countries with "worldwide tax" systems. Tax academics show that firms from "territorial tax" systems (over 95% of all countries), (Note: "Territorial tax" systems have the flexibility to apply much lower tax rates on foreign sourced income to incentivise companies to maintain their headquarters at home (e.g. Germany applies a 5% tax on foreign profits). Prior to the 2017 U.S. Tax Cuts and Jobs Act of 2017, the U.S. was one of 7 remaining jurisdictions (i.e. Chile, Greece, Ireland, Israel, South Korea, Mexico and the U.S.), to operate a "worldwide tax" system which applied a fixed single high rate of 35% tax on all worldwide income.) make little use of tax havens. The only non–U.S. foreign firms in the top 50 Irish firms are UK firms from pre–2009, after which the UK switched to a "territorial tax" system. In December 2017, the U.S. switched to a hybrid-"territorial tax" system. (Note: The TCJA's GILTI tax regime, which acts like an international alternative minimum tax for IP–heavy U.S. multinationals, has led some to qualify the new U.S. TCJA system as a hybrid–"territorial" system.)
- They are concentrated. The top–20 corporate taxpayers pay 50% of all Irish corporate taxes, while the top–10 pay 40% of all Irish corporate taxes. Post–leprechaun economics, Apple, Ireland's largest company by turnover (see Table 1), constitutes over one–quarter of Ireland's GDP. The top 10 U.S.–controlled multinationals comfortably account for over 50% of Irish 2017 GDP. (Note: Apple's Q1 2015 leprechaun economics re-structure increased Irish GDP by up to 34.4% (i.e. Apple is at least one-quarter of Irish GDP). The next 9 largest U.S.–controlled multinationals have a combined 2017 Irish turnover of €144.0 billion that exceeds Apple's 2017 Irish turnover of €119.2 billion (see Table 1))
- They are mostly technology and life sciences. To use Ireland's main BEPS tools, a multinational needs to have intellectual property (or "IP"), which is then converted into intellectual capital and royalty payment plans, which shift profits from high–tax locations to Ireland. Most global IP is concentrated in the technology and life sciences industries (see Table 1).
- They use Ireland to shield all non–U.S. profits, not just EU profits, from the US "worldwide tax" system. In 2016, Facebook recorded global revenues of $27 billion, while Facebook (Ireland) paid €30 million in Irish tax on Irish revenues of €13 billion (half of all global revenues). (Note: Similarly, when the EU introduced the GDPR regulations in 2018, Facebook disclosed that all of its non–U.S. accounts (circa 1.9 billion, of which 1.5 billion were non-E.U), were legally based in Dublin.) Similarly, Google also runs most of its non–U.S. revenue and profits through its Dublin operation.
- They artificially inflate Irish GDP by 62%. All tax havens have a distorted GDP due to the effect of BEPS flows. Apple's Q1 2015 re-structuring of their Double Irish BEPS tool into a CAIA BEPS tool, increased the distortion to such a level that in February 2017, the Central Bank replaced Irish GDP with GNI*. In 2017, Irish GDP was 162% of 2017 GNI*.
- They pay effective tax rates of 0–2.5%. Irish Revenue quote an effective 2015 CT rate of 9.8%, but this omits profits deemed not taxable. The US Bureau of Economic Analysis gives an effective 2015 Irish CT rate of 2.5%. BEA agrees with the Irish CT rates of Apple, Google and Facebook (<1%), and the CT rates of Irish BEPS tools (0–2.5%). (§ Effective tax rate (ETR))

=== Multinational job focus ===
Ireland's corporate BEPS tools emphasise job creation (either of Irish employees or of foreign employees to Ireland). To use Irish BEPS tools, and their ETRs of 0–2.5%, the multinational must meet conditions on the intellectual property ("IP") they will be using as part of their Irish BEPS tool. This is outlined in the Irish Finance Acts particular to each scheme, but in summary, the multinational must:

- Prove they are carrying out a "relevant trade" on the IP in Ireland (i.e. Ireland is not just an "empty shell" through which IP passes en route to another tax haven);
- Prove the level of Irish employment doing the "relevant activities" on the IP is consistent with the Irish tax relief being claimed (the ratio has never been disclosed); (Note: There are fewer cases of U.S. technology multinationals conducting genuine software programming origination in Ireland. The "high-value" Irish jobs tend to be "language localisation" work or "sales and marketing". These are sufficient to meet the Irish Revenue Commissioners criteria for a "relevant trade" and "relevant activities".)
- Show that the average wages of the Irish employees are consistent with such a "relevant trade" (i.e. must be "high-value" jobs earning +€60,000–€90,000 per annum); (Note: In March 2018, IDA Ireland disclosed that foreign multinationals paid €17.9 billion in wage on 210,443 Irish staff, or €85k per employee ("high-value" jobs) in 2016.)
- Put this into an approved "business plan" (agreed with Revenue Commissioners and other State bodies, such as IDA Ireland), for the term of the tax relief scheme;
- Agree to suffer "clawbacks" of the Irish tax relief granted (i.e. pay the full 12.5% level), if they leave before the end plan (5 years for schemes started after February 2013)

The percentage of Irish wages-to-profits required in the "business plan" has never been disclosed, however, commentators imply the Irish wage-roll needs to be circa 2–3% of profits booked in Ireland:

- Apple employed 6,000 people in 2014, and at a €100,000 cost per employee gave a €600 million wage-roll on 2014 Irish profits of €25 billion (see table below), or 2.4%
- Google employed 2,763 people in 2014, and at a €100,000 cost per employee gave a €276 million wage roll on Google 2014 Irish profits of €12 billion, or 2.3%

To the extent that the Irish jobs are performing real functions (i.e. the function is not replicated elsewhere in the Group), the cost is not an "employment tax", however, at worst case, the U.S. multinational should incur an aggregate effective Irish corporation tax of 2–6% (actual Irish BEPS tool tax of 0–2.5%, plus Irish employment costs of 2–3%). Therefore, as shown in § Yearly returns (2001–2019), while Irish CT has consistently been between 10 and 15% of Total Irish Tax, the additional employment contribution made by U.S. multinationals in Ireland, has led to strong growth in overall Irish Total Taxes.

=== Top 50 Irish corporations ===
The top 50 Irish companies, ranked by 2017 Irish registered revenues, are as follows:

Table 1: Top 50 Irish companies by 2017 revenue booked in Ireland (€ billions)
Rank (By Revenue)	Company Name	Operational Base	Sector (if non-IRL)	Inversion (if non-IRL)	Revenue (€2017 bn)
1	Apple Ireland	United States	technology	not inversion	119.2
2	CRH	Ireland	—	—	27.6
3	Medtronic plc	United States	life sciences	2015 inversion	26.6
4	Google	United States	technology	not inversion	26.3
5	Microsoft	United States	technology	not inversion	18.5
6	Eaton	United States	industrial	2012 inversion	16.5
7	DCC	Ireland	—	—	13.9
8	Allergan (Note: After completing its corporate inversion to Ireland, Activis would complete more transactions (e.g. $25 billion acquisition of Forest Labs), before merging with the other largest Irish corporate tax inversion, Allergan in 2015 for $70 billion; Activis replaced its name as Allergan.)	United States	life sciences	2013 inversion	12.9
9	Facebook	United States	technology	not inversion	12.6
10	Shire (Note: Shire's proposed 2014 corporate tax inversion with U.S. pharmaceutical AbbVie Inc. failed due to the 2016 Obama Administration anti-inversion rules. In 2018, Shire agreed to a lower $64 billion bid from Japanese pharmaceutical Takeda, who confirmed they would not be executing a tax inversion to Ireland (Japan's headline corporate tax rate is 35%), which was attributed to the fact that Japan, like the UK, switched to a "territorial tax" system in 2009.)	Great Britain	life sciences	2008 inversion	12.4
11	Ingersoll-Rand	United States	industrial	2009 inversion	11.5
12	Dell Ireland	United States	technology	not inversion	10.3
13	Oracle	United States	technology	not inversion	8.8
14	Smurfit Kappa	Ireland	—	—	8.6
15	Ardagh Glass	Ireland	—	—	7.6
16	Pfizer	United States	life sciences	not inversion	7.5
17	Ryanair	Ireland	—	—	6.6
18	Kerry Group	Ireland	—	—	6.4
19	Merck & Co	United States	life sciences	not inversion	6.1
20	Sandisk	United States	technology	not inversion	5.6
21	Boston Scientific	United States	life sciences	not inversion	5.0
22	Penneys	Ireland	—	—	4.4
23	Total Produce	Ireland	—	—	4.3
24	Perrigo	United States	life sciences	2013 inversion	4.1
25	Experian (Note: Ireland's largest law firm, Authur Cox, records the move of Experian plc to Ireland in 2006, as the first UK corporate tax inversion to Ireland. Experian was formed in 2006 from the de-merger of UK conglomerate GUS plc, but most of Experian's business was U.S. based (e.g it had a limited remaining connection to the UK).)	Great Britain	technology	2006 inversion	3.9
26	Musgrave	Ireland	—	—	3.7
27	Kingspan	Ireland	—	—	3.7
28	Dunnes Stores	Ireland	—	—	3.6
29	Mallinckrodt	United States	life sciences	2013 inversion	3.3
30	ESB	Ireland	—	—	3.2
31	Alexion Pharma	United States	life sciences	not inversion	3.2
32	Grafton Group	Ireland	—	—	3.1
33	VMware	United States	technology	not inversion	2.9
34	Abbott Laboratories	United States	life sciences	not inversion	2.9
35	ABP Food Group	Ireland	—	—	2.8
36	Kingston Technology	United States	technology	not inversion	2.7
37	Greencore	Ireland	—	—	2.6
38	Circle K Limited	Ireland	—	—	2.6
39	Tesco Ireland	Great Britain	food retail	not inversion	2.6
40	McKesson	United States	life sciences	not inversion	2.6
41	Peninsula Petroleum	Ireland	—	—	2.5
42	Glanbia	Ireland	—	—	2.4
43	Intel Ireland	United States	technology	not inversion	2.3
44	Gilead Sciences	United States	life sciences	not inversion	2.3
45	Adobe	United States	technology	not inversion	2.1
46	CMC Limited	Ireland	—	—	2.1
47	Ornua Dairy	Ireland	—	—	2.1
48	Baxter	United States	life sciences	not inversion	2.0
49	Paddy Power Betfair	Ireland	—	—	2.0
50	Icon Plc	Ireland	—	—	1.9
Total					454.4

From the above table:

1. U.S.–controlled firms are 25 of the top 50 and represent €317.8 billion of the €454.4 billion in total 2017 revenue (or 70%);
2. UK–controlled firms are 3 of the top 50 and represent €18.9 billion of the €454.4 billion in total 2017 revenue (or 4%);
3. Irish–controlled firms are 22 of the top 50 and represent €117.7 billion of the €454.4 billion in total 2017 revenue (or 26%);
4. There are no other firms in the top 50 Irish companies from other jurisdictions.

== Multinational tax schemes ==
=== Background ===
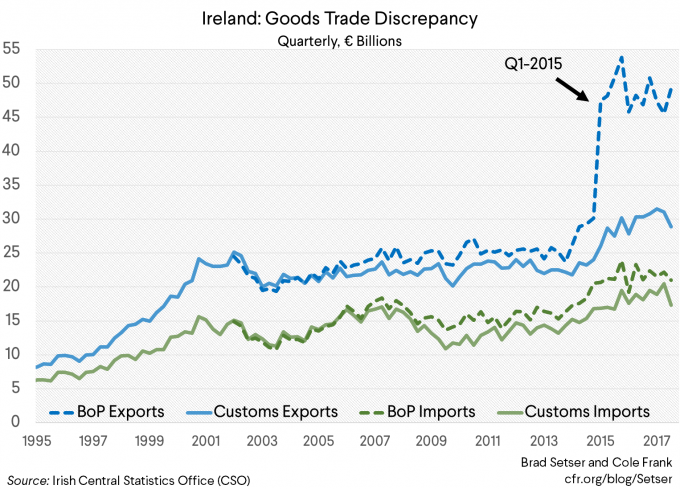
The Q1 2015 restructuring of Apple's non–U.S. IP to Apple Ireland was the largest BEPS action in history. Brad Setser & Cole Frank (CoFR).

The tax schemes used by U.S. multinationals in Ireland are called base erosion and profit shifting (BEPS) tools by tax academics. Whereas Ireland's headline corporation tax rate is 12.5%, Ireland's BEPS tools enable an effective tax rate of 0% to 2.5% to be achieved, depending on which BEPS tool is used.

Ireland has been associated with U.S. multinational profit shifting to avoid taxes since the U.S. IRS produced a list on the 12 January 1981. (Note: Ireland was listed as a manufacturing tax haven in the U.S. Internal Revenue Service (IRS) (1981) Tax Haven and Their Use by United States Taxpayers (The Gordon Report). Washington, D.C.: Special Council for International Taxation, Internal Revenue Service) In February 1994, the U.S. tax academic, James R. Hines Jr. identified Ireland as one of seven "major" tax havens for U.S. multinational profit shifting. During the 2014–2016 EU investigation into Apple's Irish BEPS tools, it was revealed that the Irish Revenue Commissioners had been issuing private rulings on Apple's Double Irish BEPS tools as far back as 1991; and that Apple, Ireland's largest company, had an ETR of less than 1%. In 2014, the EU Commission forced Ireland to close its Double Irish BEPS tool, however, Ireland had replacements in place: the Single Malt (2014), and the Capital Allowances for Intangible Assets (CAIA) (2009).

When Apple closed its hybrid–Double Irish BEPS tool in Q1 2015 and restructured into the CAIA BEPS tool, the Irish Central Statistics Office ("CSO") had to re-state Irish 2015 GDP as Apple's CAIA tool had artificially inflated Irish GDP by 34.4%; an event Paul Krugman christened in July 2016 as Leprechaun economics. Because the Irish CSO delayed the re-statement and redacted normal economic data to protect Apple's identity, it was not until January 2018, that economists could confirm Apple as the source of "leprechaun economics", and that at $300 billion, was the largest BEPS action in history. By February 2017, the distortion of Irish economic data by Irish BEPS tools had grown so large, that the Central Bank of Ireland replaced GDP with Modified GNI; 2017 Irish GNI* is 40% below Irish GDP (see Table 2).

Of the wider tax environment, O'Rourke thinks the OECD base-erosion and profit-shifting (BEPS) process is 'very good' for Ireland. 'If BEPS sees itself to a conclusion, it will be good for Ireland.'

— Feargal O'Rourke (2015)
CEO PwC (Ireland)
Architect of the Double Irish

In November 2016, Ireland signed the OECD BEPS Multilateral Instrument ("MLI") to curb global BEPS tools but opted out of Article 12 to protect the Single Malt and CAIA BEPS tools. In March 2018, the Financial Stability Forum showed Ireland's Debt–based BEPS tools made it the 3rd–largest Shadow Banking OFC in the world. In June 2018, tax academics showed Irish IP–based BEPS tools were artificially distorting aggregate EU GDP data, and had artificially inflated the EU–U.S. trade-deficit. In June 2018, tax academics confirmed IP–based BEPS tools had made Ireland the world's largest tax haven, and that the $106 billion of annual corporate profits shielded by Irish BEPS tools, exceeded the BEPS flows of the entire Caribbean tax haven system.

=== Key features ===
==== Intellectual property ====
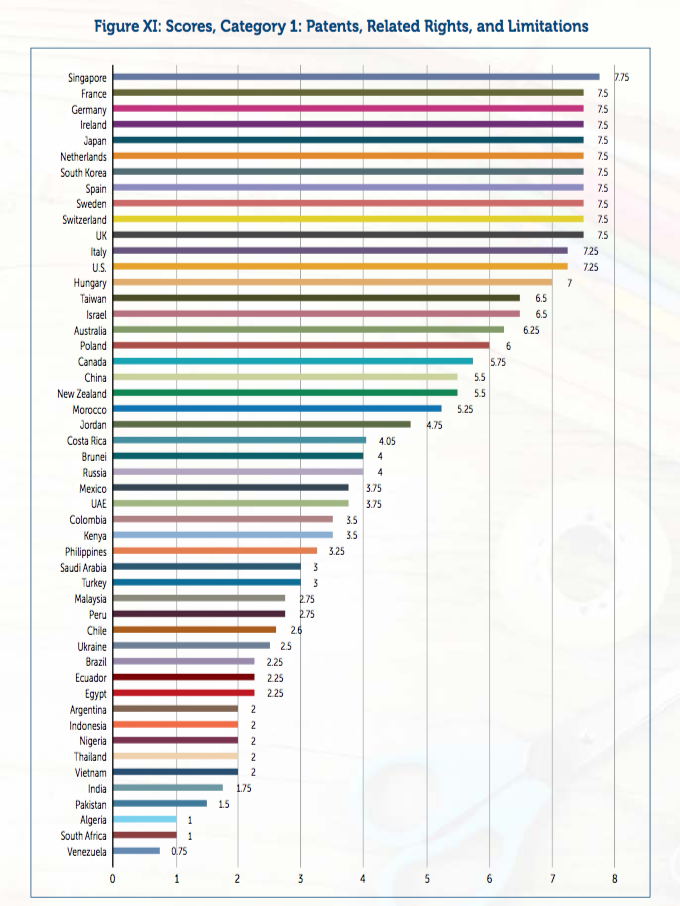
2018 GIPC League Table: Patents Sub-Category.

Ireland's main BEPS tools use intellectual property (IP) to effect the profit shift from the higher-tax locations to Ireland, via royalty payment schemes. To avoid incurring Irish corporation tax on these shifted profits, the BEPS tools either send-on the profits to traditional tax havens (with explicit 0% CT rates) via royalty payment schemes (e.g. the Double Irish and Single Malt BEPS tools), or use intangible capital allowances schemes to write-off the profits against Irish tax (e.g. the CAIA BEPS tool). This is the reason why most U.S. multinationals in Ireland are from the two largest IP–industries, namely technology companies and life sciences; or, are specific companies with valuable industrial patents such as Ingersoll-Rand and Eaton Corporation.

Ireland describes its IP–based BEPS tools as being part of its "knowledge economy"; however, U.S. tax academics describe IP as "the leading tax avoidance vehicle in the world". Despite its small size, Ireland ranks 6th in the 2018 U.S. Global Intellectual Property Center (GIPC) league table of the top 50 global centres for IP–legislation, and 4th in the important Patents sub-category (see graphic opposite).

While Ireland's most important BEPS tools are all IP–based, Ireland has other BEPS tools including Transfer Pricing–based BEPS tools (e.g. contract manufacturing), and Debt–based BEPS tools (e.g. the Irish Section 110 SPV, and the Irish L-QIAIF).

==== "Worldwide Tax" systems ====
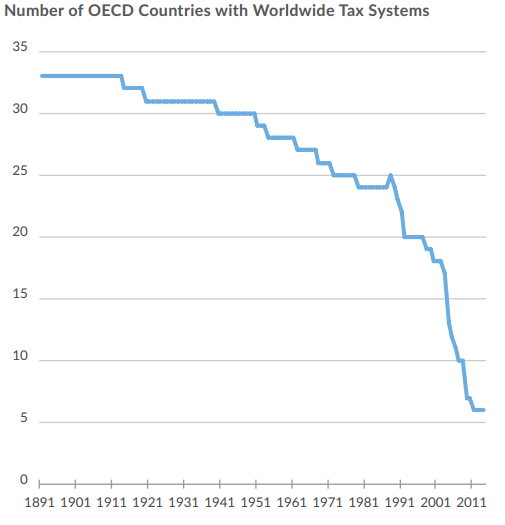
OECD "worldwide tax" countries

Ireland's IP–based BEPS tools have only attracted material operations from multinationals whose home jurisdiction had a "worldwide tax" system; namely, the U.K pre–2009, and the U.S. pre–2018 (see Table 1). Ireland has not attracted material technology or life sciences multinationals (outside of a specific plant, under its TP–based Contract Manufacturing BEPS tool), whose home jurisdiction operates a "territorial tax" system. As of November 2018, there are only 6 remaining jurisdictions in the world who operate a "worldwide tax" system, of which Ireland is one (namely, Chile, Greece, Ireland, Israel, South Korea, Mexico).

In 2016, U.S. tax academic, James R. Hines Jr. showed firms from "territorial tax" systems make little use of corporate–tax havens, as their tax code applied lower rates to foreign-sourced profits. Hines, with German tax academics, showed the German tax code charged a CT rate of 5% to the foreign profits of German multinationals. Hines was one of the most-cited sources when the U.S. Council of Economic Advisors advocated switching the U.S. tax code to a "territorial system" in the Tax Cuts and Jobs Act of 2017.

In 2014, the U.S. Tax Foundation, reported on how the UK had effectively stopped UK corporates inverting to Ireland, by switching the UK corporate tax-code to a "territorial system" over 2009–2012. By 2014, the UK HMRC reported that most of the UK multinationals that had inverted to Ireland had either returned to the UK (e.g., WPP plc, United Business Media plc, Henderson Group plc), or were about to be acquired by U.S. multinationals as part of a U.S. corporate tax inversion to Ireland (e.g. Shire plc).

==== Distortion of GDP ====
At this point, multinational profit shifting doesn't just distort Ireland's balance of payments; it constitutes Ireland's balance of payments.

— Brad Setser, Council on Foreign Relations, Tax Avoidance and the Irish Balance of Payments (2018)

An "artificially inflated GDP-per-capita statistic", is a known feature of tax havens, due to the BEPS flows. In February 2017, Ireland's national accounts became so distorted by BEPS flows that the Central Bank of Ireland replaced Irish GDP with a new economic measure, Irish Modified GNI*. However, in December 2017, Eurostat reported that Modified GNI* did not remove all of the distortions from Irish economic data.

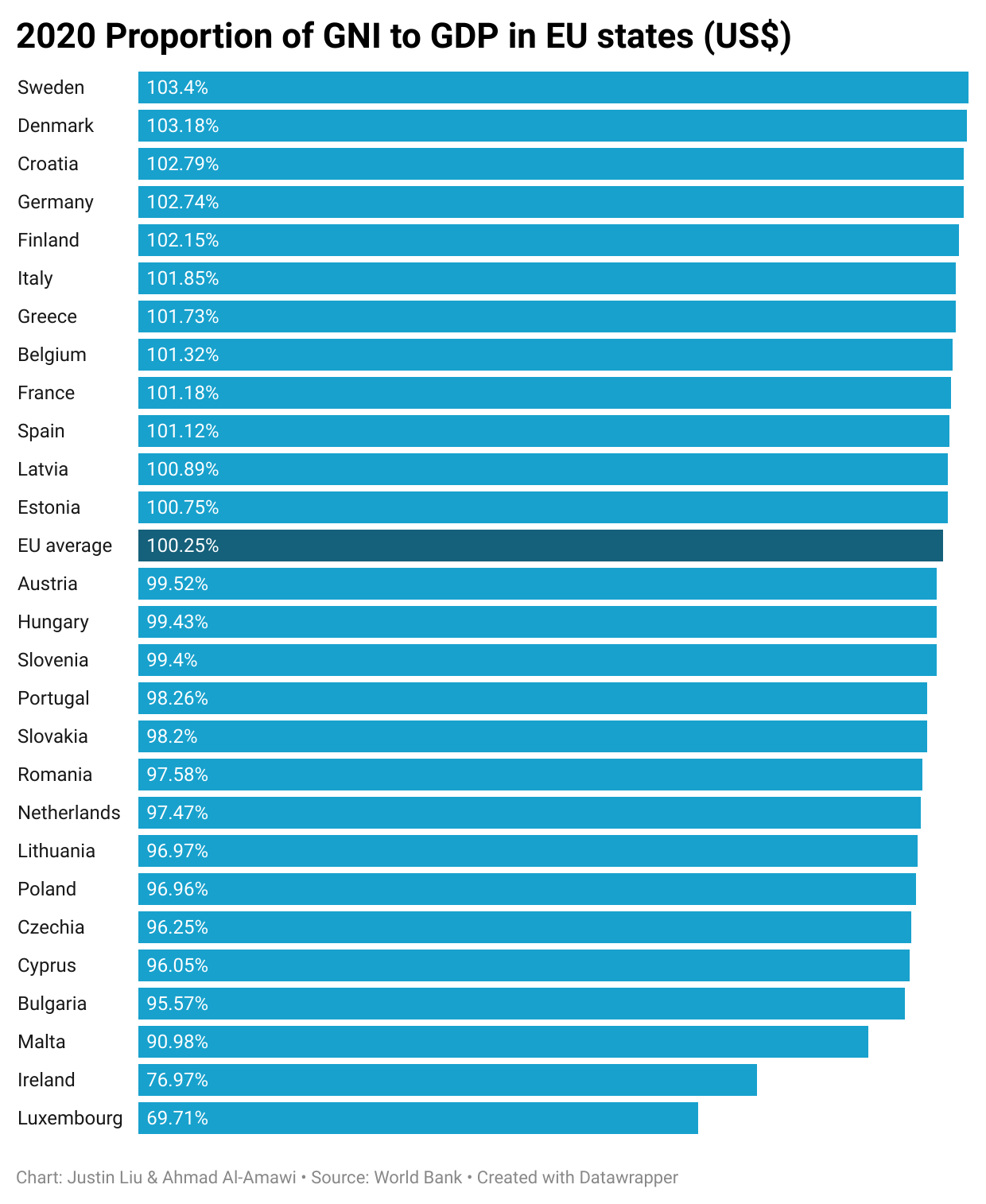
Ireland has one of the most disparate GNI to GDP ratios in the EU.

By September 2018, the Irish Central Statistics Office ("CSO") reported that Irish GDP was 162% of Irish GNI* (i.e. BEPS tools had artificially inflated Ireland's economic statistics by 62%). Irish public indebtedness changes dramatically depending on whether debt-to-GDP, debt-to-GNI* or debt-per-capita is used; the debt-per-capita metric removes all distortion from Irish BEPS tools and implies a level of Irish public-sector indebtedness that is only surpassed by Japan.

Table 2: Irish National Income and Expenditure 2017 (measured in 2018 euros) 2009–2017
Year	Irish GDP		Irish GNI*		Irish GDP/GNI* Ratio	EU–28 GDP/GNI Ratio
Year	(€ bn)	YOY (%)	(€ bn)	YOY (%)	Irish GDP/GNI* Ratio	EU–28 GDP/GNI Ratio
2009	170.1	-	134.8	-	126%	100%
2010	167.7	-1.4%	128.9	-4.3%	130%	100%
2011	171.1	2.0%	126.6	-1.8%	135%	100%
2012	175.2	2.4%	126.4	-0.2%	139%	100%
2013	179.9	2.7%	136.9	8.3%‡	131%	100%
2014	195.3	8.6%	148.3	8.3%‡	132%	100%
2015	262.5†	34.4%	161.4	8.8%‡	163%	100%
2016	273.2	4.1%	175.8	8.9%‡	155%	100%
2017	294.1	7.6%	181.2	3.1%	162%	100%

(†) The Central Statistics Office (Ireland) revised 2015 GDP higher in 2017, increasing Ireland's 2015 GDP growth rate from 26.3% to 34.4%.
(‡) Eurostat show that GNI* is also still distorted by certain BEPS tools, and specifically contract manufacturing, which is a significant activity in Ireland.

=== IP–based BEPS tools ===
==== Double Irish ====
The earliest recorded versions of the Double Irish BEPS tool are by Apple in the late 1980s; and the EU discovered Irish Revenue rulings on the Double Irish for Apple in 1991. Almost every major U.S. technology and life sciences firm has been associated with the Double Irish. Feargal O'Rourke, PwC tax partner in the IFSC (and son of Minister Mary O'Rourke, cousin of the 2008–2011 Irish Finance Minister Brian Lenihan Jnr) is regarded as its "grand architect". In 2018, tax academics showed the Double Irish shielded $106 billion of mainly U.S. annual corporate profits from both Irish and U.S. taxation in 2015. As the BEPS tool with which U.S. multinationals built up untaxed offshore reserves of circa US$1 trillion from 2004 to 2017, (Note: 2004 was the date of the last Bush Administration tax amnesty, when pre–2004 offshore untaxed cash was repatriated at a special U.S. tax rate of 5%; in 2018, the TCJA repatriation tax rate was 15.5%.) (Note: While various sources quote the amount of untaxed cash reserves as being closer to USD 2 trillion, a component of this figure represents cash flow that is awaiting reinvestment in the overseas markets, non-cash assets, and U.S. banking flows; the strong consensus is that the pure cash figure is at least over USD 1 trillion.) the Double Irish is the largest tax avoidance tool in history. In 2016, when the EU levied a €13 billion fine on Apple, the largest tax fine in history, it covered the period 2004–14, during which Apple paid an Irish ETR of <1% on €110.8 billion in Irish profits. Despite the loss of taxes to the U.S. exchequer, it was the EU Commission that forced Ireland to close the Double Irish from January 2015; with closure to existing users by 2020.

==== Single Malt ====
In an October 2013 interview, PwC tax partner Feargal O'Rourke ("architect" of the Double Irish, see above), said that: "the days of the Double Irish tax scheme are numbered". In October 2014, as the EU forced the Irish State to close the Double Irish BEPS tool, the influential U.S. National Tax Journal published an article by Jeffrey L Rubinger and Summer Lepree, showing that Irish based subsidiaries of U.S. corporations could replace the Double Irish arrangement with a new structure (now known as Single Malt). The Irish media picked up the article, but when an Irish MEP notified the then Finance Minister, Michael Noonan, he was told to "Put on the green jersey". A November 2017 report by Christian Aid, titled Impossible Structures, showed how quickly the Single Malt BEPS tool was replacing the Double Irish. The report detailed Microsoft's and Allergen's schemes and extracts from advisers to their clients. In September 2018, The Irish Times revealed that U.S. medical device manufacturer Teleflex, had created a Single Malt scheme in July 2018, and reduced their corporate tax rate to circa 3%; and that the Irish State were keeping the matter, "under consideration".

In November 2018, the Irish Government amended the Ireland–Malta tax treaty to prevent the Single Malt BEPS tool being used between Ireland and Malta (it can still be used with the UAE for example). On the same day the closure was announced, LinkedIn in Ireland, identified as a user of the Single Malt tool in 2017, announced in filings that it had sold a major IP asset to its parent, Microsoft (Ireland). In July 2018, it was disclosed in the Irish financial media that Microsoft (Ireland) were preparing a restructure of their Irish BEPS tools into a CAIA (or Green Jersey) Irish tax structure.

==== Capital Allowances for Intangible Assets ====
In June 2009, the Irish State established the Commission on Taxation, to review Ireland's tax regime, and included Feargal O'Rourke ("architect" of the Double Irish, see above). In September 2009, the Commission recommended that the Irish State provide capital allowances for the acquisition of intangible assets, creating the Capital Allowances for Intangible Assets (CAIA) BEPS tool. Whereas the Double Irish and Single Malt BEPS tools enable Ireland to act as a confidential "Conduit OFC" for rerouting untaxed profits to places like Bermuda (i.e. it must be confidential as higher-tax locations would not sign full tax treaties with locations like Bermuda), the CAIA BEPS tool, enables Ireland to act as the "Sink OFC" (i.e. the terminus for untaxed profits, like Bermuda).

I cannot see a justification for giving large amounts of Irish [corporate] tax relief to the intragroup acquisition of a virtual [IP] group asset, except that it is for the purposes of facilitating [Irish] corporate tax avoidance.

— Professor Jim Stewart, Trinity College
"MNE Tax Strategies in Ireland" (2016)

CAIA uses the accepted tax concept of providing capital allowances for the purchase of physical assets. (Note: Most tax codes in developed countries have capital allowance programs that give tax relief on capital expenditure that is amortised over the life of the physical asset on which the capital was invested in.) However, Ireland turns it into a BEPS tool by providing the allowances for the purchase of intangible assets, and particularly intellectual property assets; and critically, where the owner of the intangible assets is a "connected party" (e.g. a Group subsidiary, often located in a tax haven); and has valued the assets for the inter-Group transaction using an Irish IFSC accounting firm.

CAIA capitalises the tax shield of the Double Irish, and thus materially increases the distortion of the Irish national accounts. This was shown in July 2016 when the Irish CEO had to restate Irish 2015 GDP by 34.4% due to Apple's Q1 2015 restructure into a CAIA BEPS tool. A June 2018 report by the EU Parliament's GUE–NGL body showed that Apple doubled the Irish corporate tax shield of its CAIA BEPS tool by financing the acquisition of the IP via Jersey (the report called the CAIA BEPS tool, the Green Jersey). Whereas the Double Irish and Single Malt have an ETR of less than 1%, the ETR of the CAIA BEPS tool ranges from 0% to 2.5% depending on the date on which the CAIA tool was started (see effective tax rates). (Note: When the Irish State applied a cap of 80% on the total amount of Irish intangible capital allowances that can be used against taxable profits in any year, it gave an Irish effective tax rate (ETR) of 2.5% for the CAIA BEPS tool, being the Irish corporation tax rate of 12.5% multiplied by 20%. Therefore, the ETR of the CAIA is often described as being 0–2.5%, depending on the Irish State rules regarding caps at the date the CAIA scheme was started. During Apple's restructure into an Irish CAIA BEPS tool in Q1 2015, the cap was temporarily lifted to 100% (e.g. the ETR was 0%).)

==== Knowledge Development Box ====
Ireland created the first OECD–compliant 'Knowledge Development Box' ("KDB"), in the 2015 Finance Act, to further support its intellectual property BEPS toolkit.

The KDB behaves like a CAIA BEPS scheme with a cap of 50% (i.e. similar to getting 50%–relief against capitalised IP, for a net effective Irish tax rate of 6.25%). As with the CAIA BEPS scheme, the KDB is limited to specific "qualifying assets", however, unlike the CAIA tool, these are quite narrowly defined by the 2015 Finance Act.

The Irish KDB was created with tight conditions to ensure OECD compliance and thus meets the OECD's "modified Nexus standard" for IP. This has drawn criticism from Irish tax advisory firms who feel that its use is limited to pharmaceutical (who have the most "Nexus" compliant patents/processes), and some niche sectors.

It is expected these conditions will be relaxed over time through refinements of the 2015 Finance Act; a route taken by other Irish IP–based BEPS tools:

- Double Irish – the unusual definition of tax residence was embedded in the 1997 Taxes and Consolidation Act (TCA), and expanded in 1999–2003 Finance Acts.
- Single Malt – takes the Double Irish tax-residence concept around "management and control", and worded directly into specific bilateral tax treaties (Malta, UAE).
- Capital Allowances for Intangible Assets – introduced in the 1997 TCA but expanded in the 2009 Finance Act, and made tax-free in the 2015 Finance Act for Apple.
- Section 110 SPVs – created in the 1997 TCA with strong anti-avoidance controls, which were eroded in 2003, 2008, 2011 Finance Acts (see Section 110 article).
- L–QIAIFs – QIAIFs were introduced in 2013 with the new EU AIFMD regulations, but expanded in 2018 into a full Debt–based BEPS tool.

Irish tax-law firms expect the Irish KDB terms will be brought into alignment with the CAIA BEPS tool terms in the future.

=== Debt–based BEPS tools ===
==== Section 110 SPV ====
A Section 110 Special Purpose Vehicle ("SPV") is an Irish tax resident company, which qualifies under Section 110 of the 1997 Irish Taxes Consolidation Act ("TCA"), by virtue of restricting itself to only holding "qualifying assets", for a special tax regime that enables the SPV to attain full tax neutrality (i.e. the SPV pays no Irish corporate taxes). It is a major Irish Debt–based BEPS tool.

Section 110 was created to help IFSC legal and accounting firms compete for the administration of global securitisation deals. While they pay no Irish taxes, they contribute circa €100 million annually to the Irish economy from fees paid to the IFSC legal and accounting firms. IFSC firms lobbied the Irish State for successive amendments to the Section 110 legislation, so that by 2011, Section 110 had become an Irish Debt–based BEPS tool, for avoiding tax on Irish and international assets.

In 2016, it was discovered that U.S. distressed debt funds used Section 110 SPVs, structured by IFSC professional service firms, to avoid material Irish taxes on domestic Irish activities, while State-backed mezzanine funds were using Section 110 SPVs to lower their clients Irish corporate tax liability. Academic studies in 2017 note that Irish Section 110 SPVs operate in a brass plate fashion with little regulatory oversight from the Irish Revenue or Central Bank of Ireland, and have been attracting funds from undesirable activities (e.g. sanctioned Russian banks).

These abuses were discovered because Section 110 SPVs must file public accounts with the Irish CRO. In 2018 Central Bank of Ireland overhauled the little-used L–QIAIF vehicle, so that is now offers the same tax benefits on Irish assets held via debt as the Section 110 SPV, but without having to file Irish public accounts.

Stephen Donnelly TD estimated that U.S. funds would avoid €20 billion in Irish taxes from 2016 to 2026 on circa €40 billion of Irish investments (2012–2016), by using Section 110 SPVs.

==== L–QIAIF ====
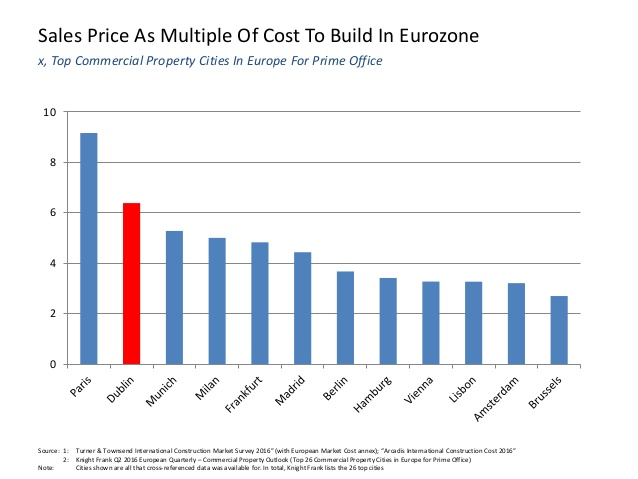
Sales price as multiple of the cost of build for a prime office in Dublin, versus other EU-28 countries (2016)

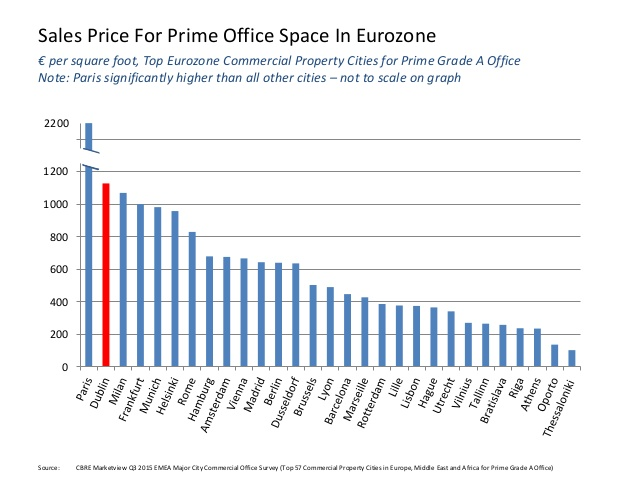
Sales price of Dublin prime office versus other EU-28 countries (2016)

The Irish QIAIF regime is exempt from all Irish taxes and duties (including VAT and withholding tax), and apart from the VCC wrapper, do not have to file public accounts with the Irish CRO. This has made QIAIF an important "backdoor" out of the Irish corporate tax system. The most favoured destination is to Sink OFC Luxembourg, which receives 50% of all outbound Irish foreign direct investment ("FDI). QIAIFs, with Section 110 SPVs, have made Ireland the 3rd largest Shadow Banking OFC.

When the Section 110 SPV Irish domestic tax avoidance scandals surfaced in late 2016, it was due to Irish financial journalists and Dáil Éireann representatives scrutinising the Irish CRO public accounts of U.S. distressed firms. In November 2016 the Central Bank began to overhaul the L-QIAIF regime. In early 2018, the Central Bank upgraded the L-QIAIF regime so that it could replicate the Section 110 SPV (e.g. closed end debt structures), but without needing to file public CRO accounts. In June 2018, the Central Bank announced that €55 billion of U.S. distressed debt assets had transferred out of Section 110 SPVs.

It is expected that the Irish L–QIAIF will replace the Irish Section 110 SPV as Ireland's main Debt–based BEPS tool for U.S. multinationals in Ireland.

The ability of foreign institutions to use QIAIFs (and particularly the ICAV-wrapper) to avoid all Irish taxes on Irish assets has been blamed for the bubble in Dublin commercial property (and, by implication, the Dublin housing crisis). This risk was highlighted in 2014 when Central Bank of Ireland consulted the European Systemic Risk Board ("ESRB") after lobbying to expand the L-QIAIF regime.

=== TP–based BEPS tools ===
Ireland's transfer pricing ("TP") based BEPS tools are mostly related to contract manufacturing. By refusing to implement the 2013 EU Accounting Directive (and invoking exemptions on reporting holding company structures until 2022), Ireland enables their TP and IP–based BEPS tools to structure as "unlimited liability companies" (ULCs) which do not have to file public accounts with the Irish CRO. In spite of this, many Irish IP–based BEPS tools are so large that tax academics have been able to separate out their scale from filed group accounts (e.g. work of Gabriel Zucman). However, Irish TP–based BEPS tools are smaller, and therefore harder to pick out from a listed multinational's group accounts. In addition, the Irish State, to help obfuscate the activities of the larger and more important IP–based BEPS tools, sometimes present their data as manufacturing data. It is generally regarded that Ireland's main TP–based BEPS tool users are the life sciences manufacturers.

== Effective tax rate (ETR) ==
=== Background ===
The headline tax rate is the rate of taxation that is applied to the profits that a tax-code deems to be taxable after deductions. The effective tax rate is the rate of taxation implied by the actual quantum of tax paid versus profits before all deductions are applied. The gap between the Irish corporate headline rate of 12.5%, and the much lower Irish corporate effective rate of 2–4%, is a source of controversy:

Many of the multinationals gathered at the Four Seasons [in Dublin, Ireland] that day pay far less than 12.5 percent tax, their accounts show. Ireland helps them do this by generously defining what profit it will tax, and what it will leave untouched.

— Holly Ellyatt, CNBC, "In Europe's Tax Race, It's the Base, Not the Rate, That Counts", 18 February 2013

Applying a 12.5% rate in a tax code that shields most corporate profits from taxation, is indistinguishable from applying a near 0% rate in a normal tax code.

— Jonathan Weil, Bloomberg View, 11 February 2014

Apple isn't in Ireland primarily for Ireland's 12.5 percent corporate tax rate. The goal of many U.S. multinational firms' tax planning is globally untaxed profits, or something close to it. And Apple, it turns out, doesn't pay that much tax in Ireland.

— Brad Setser, Council on Foreign Relations, 30 October 2017

The Irish State asserts Ireland's ETR similar to the Irish headline CT rate of 12.5%. This is an important issue as Ireland's BEPS tools, the core of Ireland's § Low tax economy, rely on having a global network of full bilateral tax treaties that accept Ireland's BEPS tools; major economies do not sign full bilateral tax treaties with known tax havens (e.g. Bermuda or Jersey). When the EU Commission published their findings on Apple's Irish BEPS tools in 2016 (see below), Brazil became the first G–20 economy to blacklist Ireland as a tax haven, and suspended the Brazil–Ireland bilateral tax treaty.

In 2014, Ireland refused to implement the 2013 EU Accounting Directive, and invoked exemptions on reporting holding company structures until 2022, so that multinationals can register as Irish "unlimited liability companies" (ULCs), which do not have to file public accounts with the Irish CRO. However, as most foreign multinationals in Ireland are major U.S. listed companies (see Table 1), tax academics have been able to estimate their Irish ETR from U.S. filings. In addition, the 2014–2016 EU investigation into Apple, Ireland's largest company, produced detail on Apple's Irish ETR from 2004 to 2014.

Make no mistake: the headline rate is not what triggers tax evasion and aggressive tax planning. That comes from schemes that facilitate profit shifting.

— Pierre Moscovici, Financial Times, 11 March 2018

=== Independent research ===
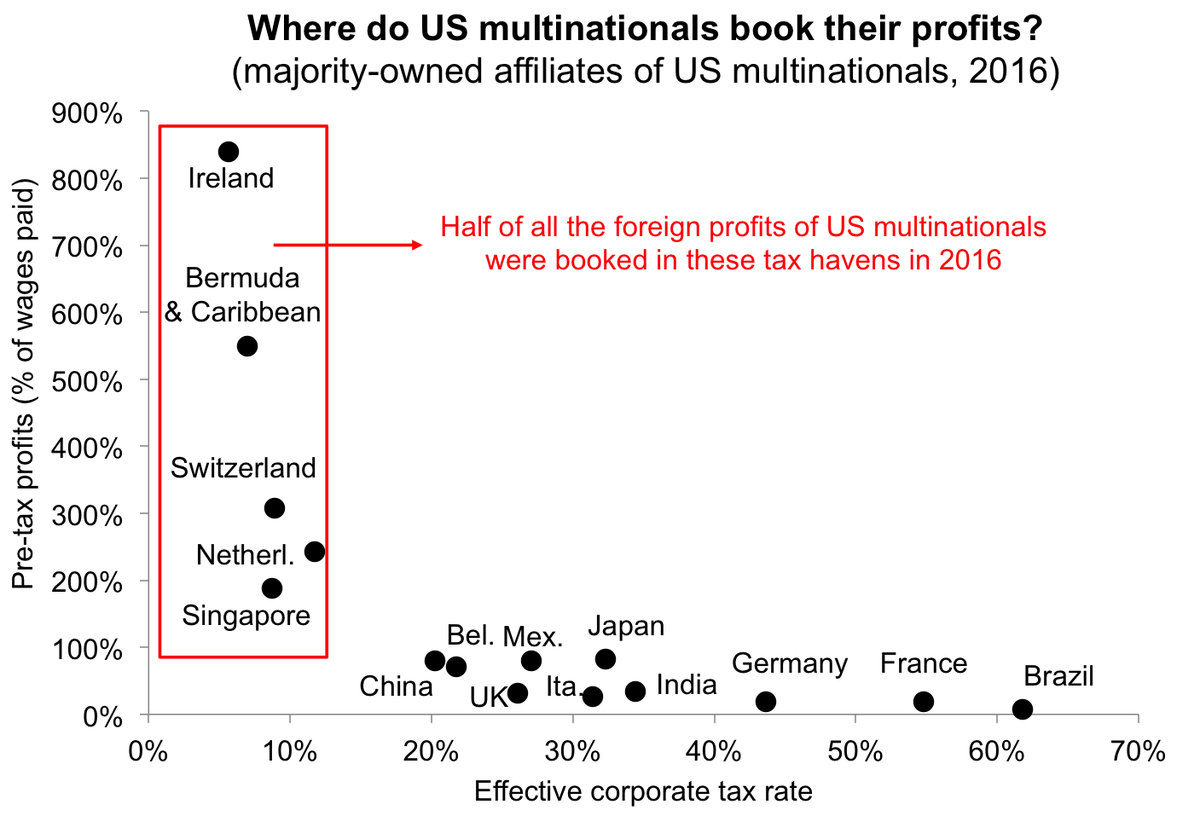
"Effective corporate tax rates" of US multinationals in various jurisdictions (2016 BEA–NBER)

Notable independent research from 1994 to 2018, has estimated Ireland's overall aggregate effective tax rate for foreign corporates at between 2.2% to 4.5%:

1. In February 1994, the most cited academic on tax havens, James R. Hines Jr., published the most cited academic paper on tax havens, titled: "Fiscal Paradise: Foreign Tax Havens and American Business"; which estimated in Appendix IV that Ireland's aggregate effective corporate rate (ETR) was 4%.
2. In October 2013, Bloomberg commissioned a Special Investigation into the tax affairs of U.S. multinationals in Ireland, which estimated that the effective tax rate of all U.S. multinationals in Ireland had fallen to 3% by 2010. The report featured research into the "architect" of the Double Irish BEPS tool, PWC tax partner Feargal O'Rourke, who Bloomberg noted was regarded as a "hero" in Ireland.
3. In February 2014, Trinity College Dublin Professor of Finance, Jim Stewart, author of studies into Ireland's tax system, used U.S. Bureau of Economic Analysis data filed by U.S. multinationals, to estimate that the effective tax rate of U.S. multinationals in Ireland for 2011 was 2.2% to 3.8%.
4. In November 2014, the Tax Justice Network, in their Ireland Country Report from the 2013 Financial Secrecy Index, said the Irish State's claims that the effective tax rate was 12.5% were "misleading", and that Ireland's corporate ETR was between 2.5% to 4.5%, depending on the various assumptions used.
5. In November 2017, Irish economist David McWilliams writing in The Irish Times quoted that the U.S. BEA statistics implied U.S. multinationals in Ireland paid an effective tax rate of 3.27% on Irish registered pre-tax income of $106,789 million in 2013, and 3.38% on Irish registered pre-tax income of $108,971 million in 2014, due to "a myriad of loopholes to avoid even our own low rates of tax".
6. In June 2018, 24 years after the 1994 James R. Hines paper into global tax havens, French tax economist Gabriel Zucman, with the NBER, in his study into the BEPS flows of global tax havens titled: The Missing Profits of Nations; also estimated in Appendix I of the study that Ireland's aggregate effective corporate tax rate was 4% (see graphic); the lowest rate of all jurisdictions (see graphic).

=== Filed accounts ===
Over the years, the largest U.S. multinationals in Ireland, who are both Ireland's largest companies and pay most of Ireland's corporation tax (see low tax economy), have filed various accounts showing their Irish ETR. As discussed above, because Ireland refused to ratify the 2013 EU Accounting Directive, many of these multinationals have switched to "unlimited liability companies" in Ireland, which do not file accounts; thus the information is only available in a few cases. However, where U.S. multinationals have disclosed Irish financials, they all imply an Irish ETR of less than 1 percent. (Note: Note that the accounts referenced below are from U.S. multinationals in Ireland who were at the time of filing, known to be using the Double Irish and Single Malt BEPS tools; they thus reflect the ETR of these specific Irish BEPS tools.)

Examples are (see Table 1 for rankings):

- Apple Inc <1% (largest Irish company, by 2017 revenues)
- Google <1% (4th largest Irish company, by 2017 revenues)
- Facebook <1% (9th largest Irish company, by 2017 revenues)
- Oracle <1% (12th largest Irish company, by 2017 revenues)

=== Marketing brochures ===
Irish BEPS tools are not overtly marketed as brochures showing near-zero effective tax rates would damage Ireland's ability to sign and operate bilateral tax treaties (i.e. higher-tax countries do not sign full treaties with known tax havens). (Note: In September 2018, Ireland had a global network of 73 bilateral tax treaties, and a 74th with Ghana awaiting ratification.) However, since the Irish financial crisis, some Irish tax law firms in the IFSC produced CAIA brochures openly marketing that its ETR was 2.5%.

where the IP is "bought-in" by an Irish company, the tax regime has recently been improved in that a tax deduction can now be claimed in respect of the capital expenditure on the acquisition of a wide variety of intangible assets. ... This can result in an effective rate of tax of 2.5% (12.5% of 20%) on income arising from the exploitation of IP where tax depreciation for the capital spend on the acquisition of IP is fully utilised.

— A&L Goodbody Law Firm, (Note: Arthur Cox is Ireland's largest law firm and A&L Goodody is second largest; Matheson describes itself as the Irish law firm with the largest tax practice group, and Maples and Calder is the world's largest offshore magic circle law firm) Ireland - A hub for developing, holding and exploiting technology (October 2009)

Intellectual Property: The effective corporation tax rate can be reduced to as low as 2.5% for Irish companies whose trade involves the exploitation of intellectual property. The Irish IP regime is broad and applies to all types of IP. A generous scheme of capital allowances. ... in Ireland offer significant incentives to companies who locate their activities in Ireland. A well-known global company [Accenture in 2009] recently moved the ownership and exploitation of an IP portfolio worth approximately $7 billion to Ireland.

— Arthur Cox Law Firm, Uses of Ireland for German Companies (January 2012)

The tax deduction can be used to achieve an effective tax rate of 2.5% on profits from the exploitation of the IP purchased [via the CAIA scheme]. Provided the IP is held for five years, a subsequent disposal of the IP will not result in a clawback.

— Matheson Law Firm, Ireland as a European gateway (March 2013)

Enhancement of the Irish onshore IP regime: ... The minimum IP-related profits that must be subject to the Irish corporate tax trading rate of 12.5% will be reduced from 20% to 0%. This will have the effect of reducing the minimum effective tax rate on IP-related profits from 2.5% to 0%.

— Deloitte Ireland. Ireland Tax Alert (October 2014)

Intangible assets – 80% cap reinstated. ... This gives an effective 2.5% corporate tax rate on such IP derived income

— Grant Thornton Ireland. Budget 2018 (October 2017)

Structure 1: The profits of the Irish company will typically be subject to the corporation tax rate of 12.5% if the company has the requisite level of substance to be considered trading. The tax depreciation and interest expense can reduce the effective rate of tax to a minimum of 2.5%.

— Maples and Calder Law Firm, Irish Intellectual Property Tax Regime (February 2018)

=== Apple investigations ===
Apple is Ireland's largest company, with Irish 2017 revenues that exceed the combined Irish 2017 revenues of the next 5 largest Irish companies added together. Apple has been in Ireland since at least December 1980, when it opened its first Irish plant in Holyhill, in Cork. Apple's tax strategies with Irish BEPS tools had long been under suspicion by tax academics and investigative journalists.

In May 2013, Apple's Irish tax practices were questioned by a U.S. bipartisan investigation of the Senate Permanent Subcommittee on Investigation. The investigation aimed to examine whether Apple used offshore structures, in conjunction with arrangements, to shift profits from the U.S. to Ireland. Senators Carl Levin and John McCain drew light on what they referred to as a special tax arrangement between Apple and Ireland which allowed Apple to pay a corporate tax rate of less than 2%. The investigation labelled Ireland as the "holy grail of tax avoidance".

In June 2014, the EU Commission launched an investigation into Apple's tax practices in Ireland for the period 2004–2014, whose summary findings were published on 30 August 2016 in a 4–page press release; with a 130–page report, including partially redacted information on Apple's Irish business (e.g. profits, employees, Board minutes etc.), published on 30 August 2016.

In July 2020, the European General Court (EGC) ruled that the EU Commission "did not succeed in showing to the requisite legal standard" that Apple had received tax advantages from Ireland, and overturned the findings against Apple.

=== Irish State rebuttals ===
In February 2014, as a result of Bloomberg's Special Investigation and Trinity College Professor Dr. Jim Stewart's ETR calculations (see above), the "architect" of Ireland's Double Irish BEPS tool, PricewaterhouseCoopers tax-partner Feargal O'Rourke, went on RTÉ Radio to state that: "there was a hole the size of the Grand Canyon", in the analysis. O'Rourke also referenced the PricewaterhouseCoopers/World Bank survey that Ireland's ETR was circa 12%.

In December 2014, the Irish Department of Finance, gathered a panel of Irish experts (but no international experts) to estimate Irish corporate ETR for the Committee on Finance Public Expenditure. The results, summarised on Section 2 (page 13) of the report, showed all of the Irish experts, with the exception of Dr. Jim Stewart, agreed with Feargal O'Rourke and PricewaterhouseCoopers:

- 11.1% Prof. Frank Barry Trinity College Dublin (using Devereaux methodology)
- 14.4% Mr. Gary Tobin Department of Finance (using European Commission/ZEW data)
- 12.5% Mr. Eamonn O'Dea Revenue Commissioners (using Irish Revenue Statistical Data)
- 12.4% Mr. Conor O'Brien KPMG (Ireland) (using Irish Revenue Statistical Data)
- 2.2% to 3.8% Prof. Jim Stewart Trinity College Dublin (using U.S. BEA Data)

In August 2016, when the EU Commission published the results of their 2–year detailed investigation of Apple's tax structure in Ireland (see above), showing that Apple's ETR in 2014 was 0.005%, the Irish Revenue Commissioners stated that they: "had collected the full amount of tax that was due from Apple in accordance with the Irish law".

In December 2017, the Department of Finance published a report they commissioned on the Irish corporate tax code by UCC economist, Seamus Coffey. The report estimated that Ireland's effective corporation tax rate for 2015 was 7.2%, based on the Net Operating Surplus Method (which accepts IP BEPS flows as tax deductible costs); and had fallen from 11.2% in 2008 (section 9.4 page 128).

== Corporate tax inversions ==
=== Background ===
An Irish corporate tax inversion is a strategy in which a foreign multinational corporation acquires or merges with an Irish–based company, then shifts its legal place of incorporation to Ireland to avail itself of Ireland's favourable corporate tax regime. The multinational's majority ownership, effective headquarters and executive management remain in its home jurisdiction. Ireland's corporate tax code has a holding company regime that enables the foreign multinational's new Irish–based legal headquarters to gain full Irish tax-relief on Irish withholding taxes and payment of dividends from Ireland.

Almost all tax inversions to Ireland have come from the US, and to a lesser degree, the UK (see below). The first US tax inversions to Ireland were Ingersoll Rand and Accenture 2009. As of November 2018, Ireland was the destination for the largest US corporate tax inversion in history, the $81 billion merger of Medtronic and Covidien in 2015. The US tax code's anti-avoidance rules prohibit a US company from creating a new "legal" headquarters in Ireland while its main business is in the US (known as a "self-inversion"). Until April 2016, the US tax code would only consider the inverted company as foreign (i.e. outside the U.S. tax-code), where the inversion was part of an acquisition, and the Irish target was at least 20% of the value of the combined group. Although the Irish target had to be over 40% of the combined group for the inversion to be fully considered as outside of the U.S. tax-code.

Once inverted, the US company can use Irish multinational BEPS strategies to achieve an effective tax rate well below the Irish headline rate of 12.5% on non–U.S. income, and also reduce US taxes on US income. In September 2014, Forbes magazine quoted research that estimated a US inversion to Ireland reduced the US multinational's aggregate tax rate from above 30% to well below 20%.

Intellectual Property: The effective corporation tax rate can be reduced to as low as 2.5% for Irish companies whose trade involves the exploitation of intellectual property. The Irish IP regime is broad and applies to all types of IP. A generous scheme of capital allowances ... in Ireland offer significant incentives to companies who locate their activities in Ireland. A well-known global company [Accenture in 2009] recently moved the ownership and exploitation of an IP portfolio worth approximately $7 billion to Ireland.

— Arthur Cox Law Firm, "Uses of Ireland for German Companies" (January 2012)

In July 2015, The Wall Street Journal noted that Ireland's lower ETR made US multinationals who inverted to Ireland highly acquisitive of other US firms (i.e. they could afford to pay more to acquire US competitors to re-domicile them to Ireland), and listed the post-inversion acquisitions of Activis/Allergan, Endo, Mallinckrodt and Horizon.

In July 2017, the Irish Central Statistics Office (CSO) warned that tax inversions to Ireland artificially inflated Ireland's GDP data (e.g. without providing any Irish tax revenue).

Redomiciled PLCs in the Irish Balance of Payments: Conducting little or no real activity in Ireland, these companies hold substantial investments overseas. By locating their headquarters in Ireland, the profits of these PLC's are paid to them in Ireland, even though under double taxation agreements their tax liability arises in other jurisdictions. These profit inflows are retained in Ireland with a corresponding outflow only arising when a dividend is paid to the foreign owner.

— Central Statistics Office (Ireland) (July 2017)

=== U.S. inversions ===
==== Share of inversions ====
As of November 2018, Bloomberg ranks Ireland as the most popular destination for U.S. tax inversions, attracting almost a quarter of the 85 inversions since 1983:

Destinations of U.S. Corporate Tax Inversions (1983–2018)
Destination	Total	Last inversion		Notable U.S. corporate tax inversions to the destination
Destination	Total	Year	Name	Notable U.S. corporate tax inversions to the destination
Ireland	21	2016	Johnson Controls	Largest U.S. inversion in history, Medtronic (2015); plus 3rd Johnson (2016), 4th Eaton (2012), and 6th Perrigo (2013).
Bermuda	19	2015	C&J Energy Services	
England	11	2016	CardTronics	Post 2009–12 overhaul of tax-code, attracted the 2nd–largest U.S. inversion in history, Liberty Global (2013).
Canada	8	2016	Waste Connections	Attracted the 5th–largest U.S. inversion in history, Burger King (2014).
Netherlands	7	2015	Mylan	
The Cayman Islands	5	2014	Theravance Biopharma	
Luxembourg	4	2010	Trinseo	
Switzerland	3	2007	TE Connectivity	
Australia	1	2012	Tronox	
Israel	1	2012	Stratasys	
Denmark	1	2009	Invitel Holdings	
Jersey	1	2009	Aptiv	
British Virgin Islands	1	2003	Michael Kors Ltd.	
Singapore	1	1990	Flextronics International	
Panama	1	1983	McDermott International	Attracted the first U.S. inversion in history, McDermott International (1983).

==== List of inversions ====
As of November 2018, the table below is the Bloomberg list of the 21 U.S. corporate tax inversions to Ireland (note, Bloomberg lists U.S. corporate tax inversions by order of the year in which they first left the U.S. which is used below). The table also includes some known aborted U.S. tax inversions to Ireland. All of the U.S. multinationals listed below are listed on stock exchanges and the Market Capitalisation is as per 21 November 2018. "Spin-off inversions" and "self-inversions" happen outside of the U.S. (e.g. the corporate/corporate parent had previously left the U.S.), and thus do not need an acquisition of an Irish—based corporate to execute the move to Ireland, as per U.S. tax code requirements (see above).

History of U.S. Corporate Tax Inversions to Ireland (as at 21 November 2018) (Note: All of the companies below are listed on stock exchanges, the market capitalisation and current legal headquaraters are as per at 21 November 2018)
U.S. multinational				Irish inversion			Current H.Q.	Comment and reference
Name	U.S. base	Mkt. Cap. ($ bn)	Left U.S.	Irish move	Irish target	Price ($ bn)	Current H.Q.	Comment and reference
Pfizer	New York	252.6	Aborted	Aborted	Actavis Plc/Allergan	160.0	New York	Pfizer aborted their 2016 inversion due to changes in the U.S. tax code.
Johnson Controls	Wisconsin	30.8	2016	2016	Tyco International	16.5	Ireland	3rd—largest U.S. tax inversion in history
Adient Plc	Michigan	2.1	2016	2016	("Spin-off inversion")	—	Ireland	"Spin-off inversion" from Johnson / Tyco inversion (2016).
Medtronic Plc	Minnesota	124.5	2015	2015	Covidien plc	42.9	Ireland	Largest U.S. tax inversion in history.
Horizon Pharma Plc	Illinois	3.4	2014	2014	Vidara Therapeutic	0.66	Ireland	Bought four other U.S. firms post-inversion.
Endo International	Pennsylvania	2.8	2014	2014	Paladin Labs (Note: At the time, Paladian was a Canadian listed firm, but Canadian rules allowed the merged Endo and Paladian to "self-invert" to Ireland.)	1.6	Ireland	Acquired Canadian Paladin and "self-inverted" to Ireland.
Chiquita	North Carolina	Private	Aborted	Aborted	Fyffes	1.3	North Carolina	Chiquita aborted their inversion with Irish-based Fyffes.
Perrigo plc	Michigan	8.2	2013	2013	Elan Corporation	8.6	Ireland	6th—largest U.S. tax inversion in history.
Mallinckrodt Plc	Missouri	2.3	2013	2013	Cadence Pharma	1.3	Ireland	Acquired U.S. Questcor for $5.6 bn in 2014.
Allegion Plc	Indiana	8.4	2013	2013	("Spin-off Inversion")	—	Ireland	"Spin-off inversion" from Irish—based Ingersoll-Rand.
Actavis Plc/Allergan	New Jersey	52.1 (Note: Market capitalisation of Allergan, to which Activis was renamed post its 2015 merger with Irish—based, Allergan)	2013	2013	Warner Chilcott	5.0	Ireland	Activis merged with Irish—based Allergan for $70 bn (2015).
Pentair Plc	Minnesota	7.2	2012	2014	("Self Inversion")	—	UK	Inverted to Switzerland (2012), Ireland (2014), then UK (2016).
Jazz Pharmaceuticals	California	8.2	2012	2012	Azur Pharma Ltd	0.5	Ireland	Inverted with privately owned Azur Pharma Limited.
Eaton Corp. Plc	Ohio	31.6	2012	2012	Cooper Industries	11.8	Ireland	4th—largest U.S. tax inversion in history.
Alkermes Plc	Massachusetts	5.2	2011	2011	Elan Drug Tech.	0.96	Ireland	Inverted with a division of Elan Corporation, Elan Drug Technologies.
Covidien Plc	Massachusetts	— (Note: Bought by Medtronic in a 2015 Irish corporate tax inversion)	2007	2007	("Spin-off Inversion")	—	Ireland	"Spin-off inversion" from Tyco (2014), bought by Medtronic (2015).
Global Indemnity Plc	Pennsylvania	0.5	2003	2013	("Self Inversion")	—	Cayman	"Self-inverted" to Ireland (2013), The Caymans (2016).
Weatherford Intl. Plc	Texas	0.6	2002	2014	("Self Inversion")	—	Ireland	Inverted to Bermuda (2002), Swiss (2008), Ireland (2014).
Cooper Industries	Texas	— (Note: Bought by Eaton Corporation in a 2012 Irish corporate tax inversion)	2002	2009	("Self Inversion")	—	Ireland	Inverted to Bermuda (2002), Ireland (2009), bought by Eaton (2012).
Ingersoll Rand Plc	North Carolina	24.6	2001	2009	("Self Inversion")	—	Ireland	Inverted to Bermuda (2001), and Ireland (2009).
Accenture Plc	Illinois	101.4	2001	2009	("Self Inversion")	—	Ireland	First inversion to Ireland; originally Bermuda (2001).
Seagate Technology	California	12.1	2002	2010	("Self Inversion")	—	Ireland	Inverted to The Caymans (2002), and Ireland (2010).
Tyco International	New Hampshire	— (Note: Bought by Johnson Controls in a 2016 Irish corporate tax inversion)	1997	2014	("Self Inversion")	—	Ireland	Inverted to Bermuda (1997), Ireland (2014).

Notable inversion by size, and/or by being one of the first U.S. corporate tax inversions to Ireland

==== U.S. countermeasures ====
In April 2016, the Obama administration announced new tax rules to increase the threshold for a U.S. corporate tax inversion to be considered a "foreign company", and thus escape U.S. taxation. The new rules were directly designed to block the proposed $160 billion merger of U.S.–based Pfizer and Irish–based Allergan, which would have been the largest corporate tax inversion in history. The rule changes worked by disregarding acquisitions a target (e.g. Allergan), had made in the 3 years prior to the inversion, in meeting the requirement for the target to be 40% of the merged group.

In December 2017, the Trump administration's U.S. Tax Cuts and Jobs Act (TCJA) overhauled the U.S. tax-code and replicated many of the changes the UK made to their tax-code in 2009–2012 to successfully combat inversions (see below). In particular, the TCJA moved the U.S. to a hybrid–"territorial tax" system, reduced the headline rate from 35% to 21% and introduced a new GILTI–FDII–BEAT regime designed to remove incentives for U.S. multinationals to execute corporate tax inversions to Ireland.

In December 2017, U.S. technology firm Vantiv, the world's largest payment processing company, confirmed it had abandoned its plan to execute a corporate tax inversion to Ireland. In Q1 2018, Pfizer disclosed that post the TCJA its global tax rate for 2019 would be 17%, similar to the circa 15–16% 2019 tax rate of past U.S. corporate tax inversions to Ireland, Eaton, Allergan, and Medtronic. In March 2018, the Head of Life Sciences in Goldman Sachs, Jami Rubin, stated that: "Now that [U.S.] corporate tax reform has passed, the advantages of being an inverted company are less obvious". In August 2018, U.S. multinational Afilias, who had been headquartered in Ireland since 2001, announced that as a result of the TCJA, it was moving back to the U.S.

As of November 2018, there have been no further U.S. corporate tax inversions to Ireland since the 2016–2017 rule changes by the Obama, and the Trump administrations.

==== Apple's inversion ====
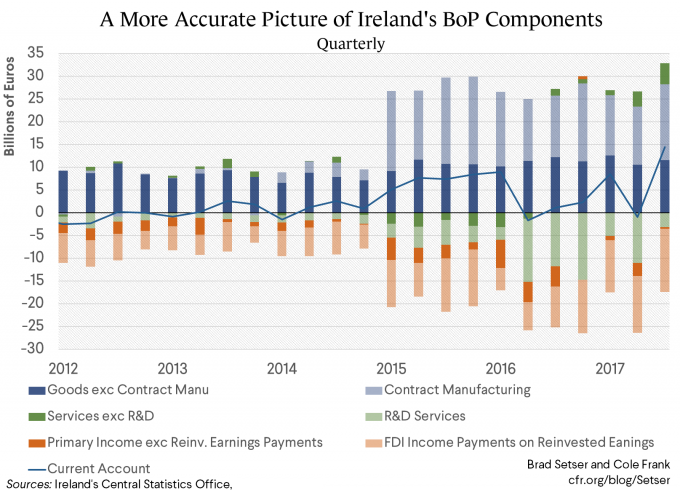
Apple's Q1 restructuring of IP on Ireland's Balance of Payments. Brad Setser & Cole Frank (the Council on Foreign Relations)

Apple's Q1 2015 re-structure of their Irish BEPS tool, is considered by some economists to be a quasi–inversion. Whereas Apple did not relocate its corporate headquarters to Ireland like Pfizer tried to do with Allergan, Apple was able to use the CAIA BEPS tool to legally re-locate $300 billion of IP, equivalent to all of Apple's non–U.S. business, to Ireland. While the Obama administration blocked the proposed $160 billion Pfizer–Allergan tax inversion to Ireland in 2016 (see above), Apple completed a much larger transaction in Q1 2015, that remained unknown until January 2018. In July 2018, Irish newspaper The Sunday Business Post reported that Microsoft was planning a similar IP–based quasi–inversion to Ireland, as Apple executed in 2015.

=== UK inversions ===
Ireland's largest law firm, Authur Cox, records the move of Experian plc to Ireland in 2006, as the first UK corporate tax inversion to Ireland. Experian was formed in 2006 from the de-merger of UK conglomerate GUS plc, but most of Experian's business was U.S. based (e.g. it had a limited connection to the UK).

Between 2007 and 2009, several UK multinationals "re-domiciled" to Ireland: WPP plc, United Business Media plc, Henderson Group plc, Shire plc and Charter (Engineering) plc. Unlike the U.S. tax code, the UK tax-code did not require the inversion to be executed by way of an acquisition of an Irish–based corporate who was at least 20% of the merged group. However, in 2009, the UK Labour government switched to a "territorial tax" system, and over 2009 to 2012, the UK Conservative government introduced a number of other corporate tax reforms including reduction of the UK headline CT rate to 20%, creation of new BEPS tools (e.g. a patent box), and re-structure of "controlled foreign corporation" (CFC) rules. By 2014, the UK HMRC reported that most of the UK multinationals that had inverted to Ireland had either returned to the UK (e.g., WPP plc, United Business Media plc, Henderson plc), or were about to be acquired by U.S. multinationals as part of a U.S. tax inversion (e.g. Shire plc).

The UK corporate tax reforms not only reversed many of Irish tax inversions but in 2014, The Wall Street Journal reported that "In U.S. tax inversion Deals, U.K. is now a winner". As of November 2018, the UK had received the 3rd–largest number of U.S. corporate tax inversions in history, only ranking behind Ireland and Bermuda in popularity (see above).

As of November 2018, there have been no further UK corporate tax inversions to Ireland since the 2009–2012 rule changes by the Labour, and the Conservative governments.

=== Other inversions ===
Ireland's largest law firm, Authur Cox, records the move of Pentair to Ireland in 2014, as the first Swiss corporate tax inversion to Ireland. However, Pentair was a U.S.–controlled firm that had previously inverted to Switzerland, and moved to Ireland (without a corporate acquisition), in 2014 to make it more attractive to a larger U.S. corporate tax inversion, which Emerson Electric attempted in 2016; however, the change in the U.S. tax-code (see above), meant that Emmerson decided to abandon the inversion, and instead purchased a division of called Pentair Valves for $3.15 billion; the renaming Pentair group re-domiciled to the UK in 2018.

As of November 2018, outside of U.S. and UK inversions to Ireland, there have been no other recorded corporate tax inversions to Ireland from other jurisdictions.

== Corporate tax haven ==
=== Ireland as a tax haven ===
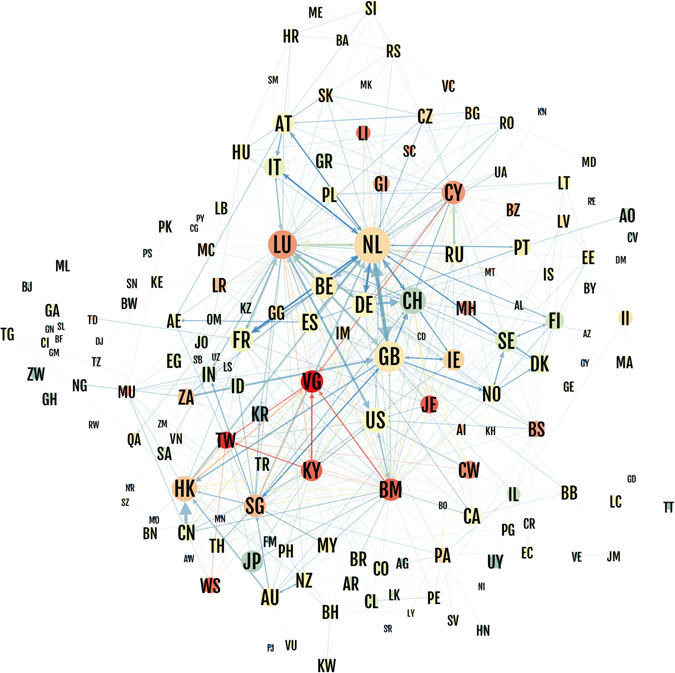
Conduit and Sink OFCs: CORPNET estimate Ireland to be one of the world's global Conduit OFCs.

Ireland is labelled both a corporate tax haven, due to its BEPS tools (e.g. Double Irish, Single Malt and CAIA), and a traditional tax haven, due to QIAIFs. The topic is covered in more detail in Ireland as a tax haven, however, the main facts regarding Ireland's corporate tax haven status are:

1. Ireland is noted as a tax haven on all academic tax haven lists (Hines 1994 2007 2010, Dharmapala 2006 2010, and Zucman 2015 2018), all main non-governmental tax haven lists (Tax Justice Network, ITEP, Oxfam), and several U.S. Congressional (2008 2015) and Senate (2013) investigations;
2. As well as appearing on all established Corporate tax haven lists, Ireland also ranks prominently on all "proxy tests" including distorted GDP-per-capita;
3. Noted tax haven academic Gabriel Zucman (et alia) estimated in June 2018 that Ireland is the largest global corporate tax haven, and larger than the aggregate Caribbean tax haven system, and that Ireland's aggregate effective tax rate on foreign corporates is 4%;
4. CORPNET (University of Amsterdam) identify Ireland as one of the five leading global Conduit OFCs who are at the nexus of corporate tax avoidance, and who traditional tax havens (e.g. Caribbean tax havens) increasingly rely on to source corporate tax avoidance flows;
5. Tax haven investigators identify Ireland as showing signs of behaving like a 'captured state' willing to foster and protect tax avoidance strategies, and using complex data protection and privacy laws (e.g. no public CRO accounts) to function as a tax haven while still maintaining OECD-compliance and transparency;

Ireland does not appear on the 2017 OECD list of tax havens; only Trinidad and Tobago is on the 2017 OECD list, and no OECD member has ever been listed. Ireland does not appear on the 2017 EU list of 17 tax havens, or the EU's list of 47 "greylist" tax havens; again, no EU-28 country has ever been listed by the EU.

=== Countermeasures to Ireland ===
==== UK countermeasures (2009–2012) ====
In September 2008, The New York Times reported that "Britain is facing a potential new problem: an exodus of British companies fleeing the tax system". During 2007–2008, several major UK multinationals executed corporate tax inversions to Ireland. During 2009–2012, both the Labour Government and the Conservative Government, overhauled the UK corporate tax code, switching from a "worldwide tax" system to a "territorial tax" system. By 2014, the UK HMRC reported most of the UK firms that inverted to Ireland had returned to the UK (e.g., WPP plc, United Business Media plc, Henderson plc), or were about to be acquired by U.S. multinationals as part of a U.S. tax inversion (e.g. Shire plc).

As of November 2018, since the UK overhauled its tax code, there have been no inversions of UK firms to Ireland; of the 3 main UK–controlled firms in Ireland (see Table 1):

- Shire plc – the UK pharmaceutical inverted to Ireland in 2009, but did not return to the UK post the 2009–2012 UK tax reforms due to acquisition interest by U.S. pharmaceutical firms attempting to use Shire plc to execute a U.S. tax inversion to Ireland; however, the Obama administration's changes to the U.S. tax code in 2016 stopped further U.S. interest in Shire plc, and in 2018, it accepted a lower bid from Japanese pharmaceutical multinational Takeda, who will not be using Shire plc to invert to Ireland.
- Experian plc – the first UK corporate tax inversion to Ireland in 2016, however almost all of Experian's business is U.S.–based, so it is unlikely to return to the UK.
- Tesco (Ireland) Tesco is not in Ireland for any tax-related reason; Tesco (Ireland) is the Irish holding company for Tesco plc's large network of Irish grocery stores.

==== EU countermeasures (1996–2018) ====
While national tax policy is excluded from EU treaties, the EU has challenged Ireland's tax code under State-aid legislation. Seamus Coffey's 2016 Review of Ireland's Corporation Tax Code chronicled how the EU withdrew the exemption from State-aid rules for Ireland's special tax rate of 10% in 1996–1998, however, Ireland countered the EU withdrawal by lowering the entire Irish standard rate of corporate tax from 40% to 12.5% over 1996–2003 (see § Historical rates (1994–2018)). In October 1994, the Financial Times chronicled how the EU Commission forced the closure of the Double Irish BEPS tool in 2015 on the threat of a full State-aid investigation into Ireland's tax code. However, Ireland won a concession from the EU to allow existing users of the Double Irish (e.g. Google, Facebook, Microsoft) to keep using it until 2020, and developed replacement BEPS tools, namely the Single Malt and CAIA BEPS tools. In August 2016, the EU Commission levied the largest corporate tax fine in history, on Apple's Irish Double Irish BEPS tool from 2004 to 2014, using State-aid rules.

In January 2017, the EU Commissioner for Taxation, Pierre Moscovici, explicitly stated to an Irish State Oireachtas Finance Committee that "Ireland is not a tax haven"; however, in January 2018 Moscovi called Ireland and the Netherlands "tax black holes". In January 2018, Ireland was accused of "tax dumping" by German political leaders.

In March 2018, the EU Commission proposed a "Digital Services Tax" (DST), targeted at U.S. technology firms using Irish BEPS tools. The DST is designed to "override" Ireland's BEPS tools and force a minimum level of EU tax on U.S. technology firms. The EU have proposed the DST should be a 3% tax on revenues which would translate into an effective 10–15% tax rate (using pre-tax margins of 20–30% for Apple, Google and Microsoft); it is also expensible against national tax, and so the DST would reduce net Irish tax (e.g. Google Ireland would offset its DST against Irish CT).

In April 2018, the EU Commission's GDPR rules forced Facebook to move 1.5 billion of the 1.9 billion Facebook accounts hosted in Ireland ( 79% of the 2.4 billion total global Facebook accounts), back to the U.S. The April 2018 Irish High Court ruling in the Max Schrems EU data-protection case could make Ireland even less attractive to Facebook.

The EU Commission's long-standing desire to introduce a Common Consolidated Corporate Tax Base ("CCCTB"), would have a more severe effect on Ireland's CT system.

==== US countermeasures (2016–2018) ====
The U.S. has had a contradictory approach to Ireland's CT system. U.S. investigations, from the first U.S. IRS study in 1981, up to and including 2013 U.S. McCain–Levin Senate investigations into Apple's tax structures, label Ireland as a "tax haven" for U.S. multinationals. However, it was the EU and not the U.S., that forced Ireland to close its Double Irish BEPS tool in 2015. While the Obama administration supported the McCain–Levin findings on Apple, it came to Apple's defense in 2016 when the EU Commission fined Apple €13 billion for taxes avoided over 2004–2014.

This contradiction is chronicled in "political compromises". The source of the contradiction is ascribed to the findings of U.S. tax academic, James R. Hines Jr.; Hines is the most cited author on tax haven research, and his important 1994 Hines–Rice paper was one of the first to use the term "profit shifting". The 1994 Hines–Rice paper showed that low foreign tax rates [from tax havens] ultimately enhance U.S. tax collections. Hines' insight that the U.S. is the largest beneficiary from tax havens was confirmed by others, and dictated U.S. policy towards tax havens, including the 1996 "check-the-box" (Note: Before 1996, the United States, like other high-income countries, had anti-avoidance rules—known as "controlled foreign corporations" provisions—designed to immediately tax in the United States some foreign income (such as royalties and interest) conducive of profit shifting. In 1996, the IRS issued regulations that enabled U.S. multinationals to avoid some of these rules by electing to treat their foreign subsidiaries as if they were not corporations but disregarded entities for tax purposes. This move is called "checking the box" because that is all that needs to be done on IRS form 8832 to make it work and use Irish BEPS tools on non–U.S. revenues was a compromise to keep U.S. multinationals from leaving the U.S. (page 10.)) rules, and U.S. hostility to OECD attempts in curbing Ireland's BEPS tools. (Note: The U.S. refused to sign the OECD BEPS Multilateral Instrument ("MLI") on the 24 November 2016.)

However, by 2014 Ireland had become the leading destination for U.S. corporate tax inversions, and in 2016, the Obama administration decided to move against Ireland's CT system by amending the U.S. tax-code to block the proposed $160 billion Pfizer–Allergan Irish corporate tax inversion, which would have been the largest tax inversion in history.

The most serious threat to Ireland's CT system, and Ireland's economic model came in December 2017 with the passing of the Tax Cuts and Jobs Act (TCJA) by the Trump administration. Parts of the TCJA are specifically targeted at Irish BEPS tools as used by U.S. multinationals in Ireland. The TCJA introduces many of the changes that the UK made to its tax code in 2009–2012, including moving to a "territorial tax" system and reduction of headline rate of tax; the UK changes reversed many of the UK corporate tax inversions to Ireland. However the TCJA goes even further and the GILTI–FDII–BEAT tax regime are a more severe "carrot and stick" to encourage U.S. multinationals to re-locate their substantive operations (and IP), back to the U.S.

However, the TCJA is large and complex, and in 2018, tax experts have noted that errors and flaws in the TCJA, could be a "boom for Ireland", over the next few years.

=== Sustainability of system ===
The above post–2009 UK, EU and U.S. countermeasures against Ireland's corporate tax system, and by extension Ireland's economic model, have been a cause of concern in Ireland, and even the "architect" of Ireland's BEPS tools, PricewaterhouseCoopers tax-partner, Feargal O'Rourke, has warned on the sustainability of Irish CT revenues.

In December 2017, the Irish Government published a study on the sustainability of its corporate tax system by University College Cork economist Seamus Coffey (called the Coffey Report). Coffey reported that Irish CT revenues were sustainable to 2020, but caveated that given the concentration of CT revenues to a handful of U.S. multinationals, a shock to CT revenues was "inevitable".

In Q2 2018, an IMF country report on Ireland, while noting the significant exposure of Ireland's economy to U.S. corporates, concluded that the TCJA may not be as effective as Washington expects in countering Ireland as a U.S. corporate tax haven. In writing its report, the IMF conducted confidential anonymous interviews with Irish corporate tax experts.

However, in June 2018, the former IMF mission-chief for Ireland Ashoka Mody, who oversaw Ireland's bailout during the 2009–2012 Irish financial crisis, warned that in relation to TCJA:

He said the Irish economy won't cope with radical changes to international tax rules, which will dent our attractiveness to multinationals. The dire warning of a massive threat to our economy is contained in a hard-hitting new book from the former head of the IMF's mission to Ireland. 'Without its low-tax regime, Ireland will find it hard to sustain economic momentum,' he said.

— Interview with Ashoka Mody, former IMF mission-chief for Ireland, 9 June 2018.

== Historical rates (1994–2018) ==
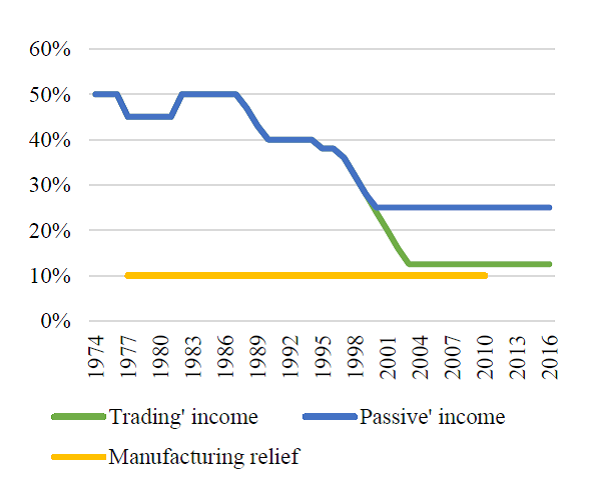
Irish corporate tax rates (1974 to 2016). Source: Revenue.

The following are the historical rates of Irish corporation tax since 1994.

A 'special rate' of 10% for companies in manufacturing (and the Shannon Free Zone), was introduced in 1980–81 (with EU State-aid approval), and extended to the financial services in the IFSC zone in 1987 (with EU State-aid approval); due to EU decision to withdraw EU State-aid approval in 1996–1998, the special rate was phased-out and ended on 31 December 2003 for new schemes, with expiry for all existing IFSC schemes in 2005, and all existing manufacturing schemes by 2010. To counter the EU's decision to withdraw State-aid approval for Ireland's special rate, the Irish State reduced the Irish standard rate of corporation tax from 40% in 1995, to 12.5% by 2003; splitting the standard rate into trading and non-trading rates in 2000.

Irish Corporate Tax Rates (1994–2018)
Taxation Year	Post–2000 Standard Rate		Pre–2000 Standard Rate	Special Rate	
Taxation Year	Trading Income	Passive Income	Pre–2000 Standard Rate	Manufacturing Income	IFSC Income
1994	—	—	40%	10%	10%
1995	—	—	40%	10%	10%
1996	—	—	38%	10%	10%
1997	—	—	36%	10%	10%
1998	—	—	32%	10%	10%
1999	—	—	28%	10%	10%
2000	24%	25%	—	10%	10%
2001	20%	25%	—	10%	10%
2002	16%	25%	—	10%	10%
2003	12.5%	25%	—	10%	10%
2004	12.5%	25%	—	10%	10%
2005	12.5%	25%	—	10%	10%
2006	12.5%	25%	—	10%	—
2007	12.5%	25%	—	10%	—
2008	12.5%	25%	—	10%	—
2009	12.5%	25%	—	10%	—
2010	12.5%	25%	—	—	—
2011	12.5%	25%	—	—	—
2012	12.5%	25%	—	—	—
2013	12.5%	25%	—	—	—
2014	12.5%	25%	—	—	—
2015	12.5%	25%	—	—	—
2016	12.5%	25%	—	—	—
2017	12.5%	25%	—	—	—
2018	12.5%	25%	—	—	—

== History ==
Ireland's corporate tax code has gone through distinct phases of development, from building a separate identity from the British system, to most distinctively, post the creation of the Irish International Financial Services Centre (IFSC) in 1987, becoming a "low tax" knowledge based (i.e. focus intgangible assets) multinational economy. This has not been without controversy and complaint from both Ireland's EU partners, and also from the US (whose multinationals, for specific reasons, comprise almost all of the major foreign multinationals in Ireland).

=== Post-independence under Cumann na nGaedheal ===
It was only with the acceptance of the Anglo-Irish Treaty by both the Dáil and British House of Commons in 1922 that the mechanisms of a truly independent state begin to emerge in the Irish Free State. In keeping with many other decisions of the newly independent state the Provisional Government and later the Free State government continued with the same practices and policies of the Irish administration with regard to corporate taxation.

This continuation meant that the British system of "corporate profits taxation" ("CPT") in addition to income tax on the profits of firms was kept. The CPT was a relatively new innovation in the United Kingdom and had only been introduced in the years after World War I, and was widely believed at the time to have been a temporary measure. However, the system of firms being taxed firstly through income tax and then through the CPT was to remain until the late seventies and the introduction of Corporation Tax, which combined the income and corporation profits tax in one.

During the years of W. T. Cosgrave's governments, the principal aim with regard to fiscal policy was to reduce expenditure and follow that with similar reductions in taxation. This policy of tax reduction did not extend to the rate of the CPT, but companies did benefit from two particular measures of the Cosgrave government. Firstly, and probably the achievement of which the Cumann na nGaedheal administration was most proud, was the reduction by 50% in the rate of income tax from 6 shillings in the pound to 3 shillings. While this measure benefited all income earners, be they private individuals or incorporated companies, a number of adjustments in the Finance Acts, culminating in 1928, increased the allowance on which firms were not subject to taxation under the CPT. This allowance was increased from £500, the rate at the time of independence, to £10,000 in 1928. This measure was in part to compensate Irish firms for the continuation of the CPT after it has been abolished in the United Kingdom.

A measure which marked the last years of the Cumann na nGaedheal government, and one that was out of kilter with their general free trade policy, but which came primarily as a result of Fianna Fáil pressure over the 'protection' of Irish industry, was the introduction of a higher rate of CPT for foreign firms. This measure survived until 1948, when the Inter-Party government rescinded it, as many countries with which the government was attempting to come to double taxation treaties viewed it as discriminatory.

=== Fianna Fáil under Éamon de Valera ===
The near twenty years of Fianna Fáíl government between from 1931 to 1948, cannot be said to have been a time where much effort was expended on changing or analysing the taxation system of corporations. Indeed, only one policy sticks out during those year of Fianna Fáil rule; being the continued reduction in the level of the allowance on which firms were to be exempt from taxation under the CPT, from £10,000 when Cumman na nGaehael left office, to £5,000 in 1932 and finally to £2,500 in 1941. The impact of this can be seen in the increasing importance of CPT as a percentage of government revenue, rising from and less than 1% of tax revenue in the first decade of the Free State to 3.64% in the decade 1942–43 to 1951–52. This increase in revenue from the CPT was due to more firms being in the tax net, as well as the reduction in allowances. The increased tax net can be seen from the fact that between 1932–33 and 1938–39, the number of firms paying CPT increased by over 33%. One other aspect of the Fianna Fáil government which bears all the fingerprints of Seán Lemass, was the 1946 decision to allow mining companies to write off all capital expenditure against tax over five years.

=== Seán Lemass and an Irish tax system ===
The period between after the late 1950s and up to the mid-1970s can be viewed as a period of radical change in the evolution of the Irish Corporate Taxations system. The increasing realisation of the government that Ireland would be entering into an age of increasing free trade encouraged a number of reforms of the tax system. By the mid-1970s, a number of amendments, additions and changes had been made to the CPT, these included fifteen-year tax holidays for exporting firms, the decision by the government to allow full depreciation in 1971 and in 1973, and the Section 34 of the Finance Act, which allowed total tax relief in respect of royalties and other income from licenses patented in Ireland.

This period from c.1956 to c.1975, is probably the most influential on the evolution of the Irish corporate tax system and marked the development of an 'Irish' corporate tax system, rather than continuing with a version of the British model.

This period saw the creation of Corporation Tax, which combined the Capital Gains, Income and Corporation Profits Tax that firms previously had to pay. Future changes to the corporate tax system, such as the measures implemented by various governments over the last twenty years can be seen as a continuation of the policies of this period. The introduction in 1981 of the 10% tax on manufacturing was simply the easiest way to adjust to the demands of the EEC to abolish the export relief, which the EEC viewed as discriminatory. With the accession to the EEC, the advantages of this policy became increasingly obvious to both the Irish government and to foreign multi-nationals; by 1982 over 80% of companies who located in Ireland cited the taxation policy as the primary reason they did so.

=== Charles Haughey low-tax economy (1987–2009) ===
The Irish International Financial Services Centre (IFSC) was created in Dublin in 1987 by Taoiseach Charles Haughey with an EU approved 10% special economic zone corporate tax rate for global financial firms within its 11-hectare site. The creation of the IFSC is often considered the birth of the Celtic Tiger and the driver of its first phase of growth in the 1990s.

In response to EU pressure to phase out the 10% IFSC rate by the end 2005, the overall Irish corporation tax was reduced to 12.5% on trading income, from 32%, effectively turning the entire Irish country into an IFSC. This gave the second boost to the Celtic Tiger from 2000 up until the Irish economic crisis in 2009.

In the 1998 Budget (in December 1997) Finance Minister, Charlie McCreevy introduced the legislation for a new regime of corporation tax that led to the introduction of the 12.5% rate of corporation tax for trading income from 1 January 2003. The legislation was contained in section 71 of the Finance Act 1999 and provided for a phased introduction of the 12.5% rate from 32% for the financial year 1998 to 12.5% commencing from 1 January 2003. A higher rate of corporation tax of 25% was introduced for passive income, income from a foreign trade and some development and mining activities. Manufacturing relief, effectively a 10% rate of corporation tax, was ended on 31 December 2002. For companies that were claiming this relief before 23 July 1998, it would still be available until 31 January 2010. The 10% rate for IFSC activities ended on 31 December 2005 and after this date, these companies moved to the 12.5% rate provided their trade qualified as an Irish trading activity.

The additional passing of the important Irish Taxes Consolidation Act, 1997 ("TCA") by Charlie McCreevy laid the foundation for the new vehicles and structures that would become used by IFSC law and accounting firms to help global multinationals use Ireland as a platform to avoid non-US taxes (and even the 12.5% Irish corporate tax rate). These vehicles would become famous as the Double Irish, Single Malt and the Capital Allowances for Intangible Assets tax arrangements. The Act also created the Irish Section 110 SPV, which would make the IFSC the largest securitisation location in the EU.

=== Post crisis zero-tax economy (2009–2018) ===
The Irish financial crises created unprecedented forces in the Economy. Irish banks, the largest domestic corporate taxpayers, faced insolvency, while Irish public and private debt-to-GDP metrics approached the highest levels in the OECD. The Irish Government needed foreign capital to re-balance their overleveraged economy. Directly, and indirectly, they amended many Irish corporate tax structures from 2009 to 2015 to effectively make them "zero-tax" structures for foreign multinationals and foreign investors. The US Bureau of Economic Analysis ("BEA") "effective" Irish CT rate, fell to 2.5%.

They materially expanded the capital allowances for intangible assets scheme in the 2009 Finance Act. This would encourage US multinationals to locate intellectual property assets in Ireland (as opposed to the Caribbean, as per the double Irish scheme), which would albeit artificially, raise Irish economic statistics to improve Ireland's "headline" Debt-to-GDP metric. They also indirectly, allowed US distressed debt funds to use the Irish Section 110 SPV to enable them to avoid Irish taxes on the circa €100bn of domestic Irish assets they bought from NAMA (and other financial institutions) from 2012 to 2016.

While these BEPS schemes were successful in capital, they had downsides. US multinational tax schemes lead to large distortions in Irish GNI/GNP/GDP statistics. When Apple "onshored" their ASI subsidiary in January 2015, it caused Irish GDP to rise 26.3% in one quarter ("leprechaun economics"). Foreign multinationals were now 80% of corporate taxes, and concentrated in a smaller group. In response, the Government introduced "modified GNI" (or GNI*) in 2017, which was circa 40% below 2017 Irish GDP, and a paired back of some BEPS schemes to improve corporation tax sustainability.

Ireland's BEPS tax strategy led it to become labelled as one of the top 5 global conduit OFCs, and has come under attack from the US and the EU (Apple's largest tax fine in history). Under pressure from the EU, Ireland closed down the double Irish in 2015, which was described as the largest tax avoidance scheme in history. However, Ireland replaced it with the new single malt system, and an expanded capital allowances scheme. More targeted responses have come in the form of the US 2017 TCJA (esp. FDII and GILTI rates), and the EU's 2018 impending Digital Services Tax.

== See also ==
- Taxation in the Republic of Ireland
- Corporate tax haven
- Feargal O'Rourke architect of Ireland's BEPS tools
- Matheson (law firm) Ireland's largest U.S. tax advisor

== Sources ==
- "Review of Ireland's Corporation Tax Code (Mr. Seamus Coffey)" (PDF). Department of Finance (Ireland). 30 June 2017.
- "The historical development and international context of the Irish corporate tax system" (PDF). Ernst & Young. 2015.
- "Irish Tax Facts 2017" (PDF). PwC Ireland. 2017.
- "Challenges Forecasting Irish Corporation Tax (AN 10)" (PDF). Irish Fiscal Advisory Council. September 2016.
- "Ireland 2013" (PDF). International Taxation Review. 2013.
- "Holding Company Structures in Ireland" (PDF). Dillon Eustace. 2016.
- "Report on Ireland's Relationship with Global Corporate Taxation Architecture" (PDF). Department of Finance (Ireland). December 2014. Archived from the original (PDF) on 9 May 2018.
- Gabriel Zucman (April 2018). "The Missing Profits of Nations" (PDF).

== External references ==
- Irish Industrial Development Authority Corporate Tax ("CT") Portal
- Revenue Commissioners Corporate Tax ("CT") Portal
- Ernst & Young Ireland Corporate Tax Portal
- Irish Tax Institute Portal
