= Richard Pazdur =

American oncologist

Director of Center for Drug Evaluation and Research
- Incumbent
- Assumed office 2025
- President: Donald Trump
- Preceded by: George Tidmarsh

Director of the Oncology Center of Excellence
- Incumbent
- Assumed office 2005

Personal details
- Education: Northwestern University, Stritch School of Medicine
- Scientific career
- Fields: Oncology
- Institutions: Food and Drug Administration

Richard Pazdur is an American oncologist who briefly served as the director of the Center for Drug Evaluation and Research at the Food and Drug Administration. From 2005 to 2025, Pazdur was the founding director of the Oncology Center of Excellence within the FDA. Previously, Pazdur was the director of the FDA's Office of Hematology Oncology Products from 1999 to 2005.

== Career ==
Richard earned a Bachelor of Science degree from Northwestern University in 1973, followed by a Doctor of Medicine from Loyola University Stritch School of Medicine. He then did his fellowship at Rush-Presbyterian-St. Luke's Medical Center. He was on the faculty of Wayne State University from 1982 to 1988. He would then join MD Anderson Cancer Center from 1988 to 1999.

Pazdur is best known for growing the FDA oncology center from a small generalized division to over hundreds of oncologists across a number of specialties. He was credited with achieving faster approval times for cancer drugs. The office was formed as the Office of Hematology and Oncology Products (OHOP) in 2005 before being launched as the Oncology Center of Excellence in 2017 as part of the Cancer Moonshot Initiative.

On November 11, 2025, the Trump administration named Pazdur as the director of the Center for Drug Evaluation and Research after previous director George Tidmarsh resigned amidst accusations of abuse of power. However, his plans to retire from the FDA were announced only a few weeks later.

== Personal life ==
Pazdur grew up in Calumet City, Illinois. Pazdur met his wife Mary, an oncology nurse practitioner, while training at Rush-Presbyterian-St. Luke's Medical Center. They were married in Chicago prior to starting his new position at Wayne State.
