= Ibuprofen/famotidine =

Combination medication to relieve pain from rheumatoid arthritis

Combination of
- Ibuprofen: Nonsteroidal anti-inflammatory drug (NSAID)
- Famotidine: H2 antagonist

Clinical data
- Trade names: Duexis
- Other names: HZT-501
- AHFS/Drugs.com: Micromedex Detailed Consumer Information
- License data: US DailyMed: Ibuprofen and famotidine
- Routes of administration: By mouth
- ATC code: M01AE51 (WHO)

Legal status
- Legal status: US: ℞-only

Identifiers
- CAS Number: 1011231-26-7
- KEGG: D11575

Ibuprofen/famotidine, sold under the brand name Duexis, is a fixed-dose combination medication used for the treatment of rheumatoid arthritis and osteoarthritis. It contains ibuprofen, a nonsteroidal anti-inflammatory drug (NSAID) and famotidine, a histamine H2-receptor antagonist.

Ibuprofen/famotidine is available as a generic medication.
