= Global minimum corporate tax rate =

Proposed international tax scheme

OECD plan to set a global minimum corporate tax rate of 15%: Initial signatories; Subsequent signatories; Non-signatories; Withdrawn; Not members of the inclusive framework (unable to sign)

The global minimum corporate tax rate, or simply the global minimum tax (abbreviated GMCT or GMCTR), is a minimum rate of tax on corporate income internationally agreed upon and accepted by individual jurisdictions under "Pillar Two" in the OECD/G20 Inclusive Framework. Each country would be eligible for a share of revenue generated by the tax. The aim is to reduce tax competition between countries and discourage multinational corporations (MNC) from profit shifting that avoids taxes.

== History ==
In 1992, a minimum corporate tax rate was proposed on a regional scale for the European Union member states. The proposal was made by the Ruding Committee in 1992, a European Commission expert panel led by Onno Ruding. The committee's proposal, of a 30% minimum tax, was however not implemented.

== OECD/G20 Inclusive Framework agreement 2021 ==
In 2019, the OECD, an intergovernmental association of mostly rich countries, began proposing a global minimum corporate tax rate. It argued that the increasing global economic significance of digital products and services requires an update to taxation rules to prevent companies from shifting profits to jurisdictions with a lower corporate tax rate. The OECD formed a group, called OECD/G20 Inclusive Framework, that has since been exploring a minimum tax rate among its member states.

In May 2019, Germany and France published a joint proposal for a global minimum effective tax rate named Pillar Two, with the goal of stopping the race to the bottom. Olaf Scholz, then-German Federal Minister of Finance, called the fair taxation of companies one of the main priorities of Germany's presidency of the OECD's Committee on Fiscal Affairs and said that if no agreement can be reached within the OECD, the EU is prepared to take action unilaterally. This Franco-German proposal received wide international support, and both the then-IMF Managing Director Christine Lagarde as well as the then-OECD Secretary-General Angel Gurría endorsed it.

In 2020, the group's then 137 member states called the blueprint for Pillar Two "a solid basis for a systemic solution that would address remaining base erosion and profit shifting (BEPS) challenges". The United States joined the talks of the OECD/G20 group on (tax-) Base Erosion and Profit Shifting in 2020, and in April 2021, Janet Yellen, the United States Treasury Secretary, agreed with the Franco-German proposal.

In June 2021, a meeting of the Group of Seven finance ministers in the leadup to the 2021 G7 Summit endorsed a global minimum corporate tax rate of at least 15% on the 100 largest multinational companies to disincentivize a race to the bottom by countries to attract such multinationals. French Finance Minister Bruno Le Maire described the 15% threshold as a starting point that could be raised in the future. Yellen described the pledge as positive for the world economy by leveling the playing field and encouraging positive competition. The chief executive of the Tax Justice Network said that the deal was historic, but unfair and should have been at least 25%. Liu Kun, China's Minister of Finance, said in 2021 that the planned agreement would help create a "fair and sustainable" international tax system.

On 1 July 2021, 130 countries backed an OECD plan to set a global minimum corporate tax rate of 15 per cent.

On 8 October 2021, the EU members Republic of Ireland, Hungary, and Estonia agreed to the OECD plan under the condition that the 15% tax rate will not be raised. The 8 October 2021 statement is called Statement on a Two-Pillar Solution to Address the Tax Challenges Arising from the Digitalisation of the Economy. 137 countries in total have approved it. For implementation, it has to be approved by the signatory countries' parliaments.

== Implementation ==
As of July 2022, the UK and Japan have drafted implementation guidelines for the agreement, while the overwhelming majority of other signatories has not yet taken steps in implementing the agreement.

On 2 February 2023, the OECD released technical guidelines for the actual implementation of the global minimum tax. The document provides guidance on several aspects of the Global Anti-Base Erosion (GloBE) Rules. This includes guidance on the recognition of the United States' minimum tax, known as the Global Intangible Low-Taxed Income (GILTI), under the GloBE Rules. It also provides guidance on the design of Qualified Domestic Minimum Top-up Taxes and on the scope, operation, and transitional elements of the GloBE Rules. This guidance is intended to assist Inclusive Framework members in implementing the rules in a coordinated manner through their domestic legislation. The guidance addresses technical issues raised by stakeholders, such as the collection of top up tax in a jurisdiction in a period where the jurisdiction has no GloBE income and the treatment of debt releases and certain tax credit equity structures.

An analysis from Reuters in June 2023 said the deal was at risk due to US domestic political disputes.

In July 2023, 138 countries agreed to move forward with the reform and committed sign the multilateral convention in the same year. The convention is expected to enter into force in 2025. The Subject-to-Tax Rule (STTR) documentation will be open to signature in October 2023.

Surveys conducted in 2025 in each of the EU's 27 Member States have found high levels of support for large multinationals contributing toward a global minimum tax in each country in which they operate.

=== Implementation in Switzerland ===
Switzerland is planning to implement OECD minimum taxation through a constitutional amendment. This amendment was approved by popular vote on 18 June 2023, which gave the Federal Council of Switzerland the authority to implement minimum taxation by ordinance. After six years, the Federal Council will be required to submit a federal law to Parliament for approval.

Only a small fraction of companies in Switzerland will be directly affected by the tax reform. In fact, approximately 99% of companies in Switzerland will not be directly affected and will continue to be taxed as before. Although the full financial impact of the reform is difficult to estimate, initially the annual tax receipts from the supplementary tax are estimated to bring in approximately CHF 1 billion to CHF 2.5 billion, which is equivalent to about 1.2 to 2.8 billion US dollars as of April 2023. About 75% of the tax revenue is to be distributed to those cantons where large companies were previously taxed at a lower rate, and the Confederation is entitled to the remaining 25%.

On 22 December 2023, the Federal Council decided to apply the Global minimum tax from 1 January 2024.

=== Possible implementation in the United States ===
After assuming office for his second term in January 2025, President Donald Trump issued an Executive Order stating that the United States would, effectively, withdraw from and not further apply provisions of the global tax deal. This put the agreement in doubt since it would likely not go forward without the U.S., which is home to several of the world’s largest companies and digital services providers.

In January 2026, the 147 countries and jurisdictions working within the OECD Inclusive Framework agreed to a 'side-by-side arrangement' that accommodated objections from the United States. The Treasury said that the agreement would "have U.S.-headquartered companies remain subject to only U.S. global minimum taxes while exempting them from Pillar Two". This is based on a recognition of the fact that the United States already operates corporate global minimum taxes of c.15% of (albeit these are blended and don't operate jurisdiction by jurisdiction, as per the OECD's proposals).

== Implementation of pillars by country and date ==
Implementation
	Pillar 1	Pillar 2	
Country	Date	Date	Note
Australia		1 January 2024	
Austria		1 January 2024	
Belgium		31 December 2023	
Bulgaria		1 January 2024	
Canada		31 December 2023	
Croatia		31 December 2023	
Cyprus		31 December 2023	
Czech Republic		31 December 2023	
Denmark		31 December 2023	
Finland		31 December 2023	
France		31 December 2023	
Germany		31 December 2023	
Hungary		1 January 2024	
Ireland		31 December 2023	
Italy		31 December 2023	
Japan		1 April 2024	
Liechtenstein		1 January 2024	
Luxembourg		31 December 2023	
Malaysia		1 January 2025	
Netherlands		31 December 2023	
Norway		31 December 2023	
Romania		31 December 2023	
Singapore		1 January 2025	
Slovakia		31 December 2023 (partial)	
Slovenia		31 December 2023	
South Korea		1 January 2024	
Sweden		31 December 2023	
Switzerland		31 December 2023 (partial)	
Thailand		1 January 2025	
United Kingdom		31 December 2023	

== UN tax convention ==
Some African countries criticized the OECD-led minimum tax for being led by the OECD, a club of mostly rich countries. Instead, they argued, global taxation rules should be agreed at the United Nations level, just as climate and development goals are. The G77 bloc of over 130 developing countries agreed. In response in 2023, the UN economic and finance committee voted to draft a UN Framework Convention on International Tax Cooperation.

== Criticism ==
University of California, Berkeley professor Gabriel Zucman applauded the OECD efforts to eliminate corporate tax havens, but criticized the proposed minimum tax rate of 15%, a rate lower than the average combined federal and state income tax rates paid by individual Americans. In Zucman's opinion, a 15% minimum rate would be too small, and recommended raising the minimum rate to 25%, since large corporations could afford the higher minimum rate.

The OECD minimum global corporate tax has been criticized by some low- and middle-income countries (LMICs) for not providing an equitable solution for reallocating global taxing rights. While G-7 countries have celebrated the deal as a breakthrough in ending the race to the bottom in corporate taxation worldwide, LMICs have expressed concerns about various inequities embedded in the deal. A number of countries did not sign up immediately over these concerns, including Sri Lanka, Pakistan, and a majority of African countries, although some have since agreed to sign. Concerns include high-income countries having first choice at collecting additional top-up taxes on multinational enterprises (MNEs), the low rate of minimum taxes creating a race to the bottom on corporate income tax rates, and LMICs having to forgo existing and future digital service taxes in exchange for a new formula-based approach to MNE profit reallocation that could undermine their revenue base. Since the tax is not centrally collected, but only on an individual nation basis, G-7 countries were projected to receive 60 percent of the estimated $150 billion in new tax revenue generated, despite being home to only 10 percent of the world's population.

Christian Hallum, tax policy lead at Oxfam, called the OECD initiative a "tax-haven reshuffle", which could normalise minimal taxation and exceptions to it.

== Global taxes vs digital taxes ==
A separate initiative under the OECD/G20 Inclusive Framework is a plan to tax the largest multinational enterprises (with global revenues of €20 billion or more) in countries where they have a significant customer base (also called "Pillar One"). The plan is meant to provide an alternative to digital services taxes (DSTs), which were introduced as a way to tax multinational enterprises in countries where they operate but may pay little or no tax, as they have no physical presence there. Unlike a typical corporate income tax which is imposed on profits (revenue minus expenses), a DST is a tax on revenue. Countries that have introduced DSTs include many European Union countries, the UK, India, and Canada. The U.S. has opposed DSTs, arguing that they may discriminate against American firms, and a DST can lead to double taxation. As part of the agreement, all countries would eliminate DSTs.

== See also ==
- Tax competition, which may lead to a race to the bottom between countries
- Base erosion and profit shifting
- List of countries by tax rates for a comparison of corporate tax rates around the world, and Tax rates in Europe for just the continent
- Corporate haven, a country with low effective tax rates for corporations
- World taxation system
- International taxation
- OECD/G20 Inclusive Framework
- Global minimum tax on billionaires proposal
