= OECD/G20 Inclusive Framework =

Multinational plan for corporate taxation

The OECD/G20 Inclusive Framework is a plan to have large multinational enterprises "pay their fair share of taxes" in the countries where they do business, rather than where they declare their profits.

The Framework has two components, or "pillars." Pillar One would allocate taxing rights over large multinational enterprises to countries where the companies have a significant customer base, even if they have no physical presence there. Pillar Two implements a minimum 15% corporate tax rate on large multinational enterprises (with revenues above €750 million) to help prevent countries undercutting each other with low tax rates.

After years of negotiations, 136 countries agreed to the Framework in 2021. By 2024, around 40 countries had laws in place to apply the global minimum corporate tax rate (Pillar Two). However, due to the complexity of implementation and disagreements over how profits should be allocated, consensus on implementation of Pillar One was not reached by the 30 June 2024 deadline. Also, in early 2025 President Donald Trump ordered the U.S. Treasury to prepare options for measures against countries that have tax rules which disproportionately affect American companies. This put both pillars in doubt since they are not likely to go forward without the U.S., which is home to several of the world's largest companies.

On 5 January 2026 the OECD announced an agreement was reached to continue implementation of the global minimum tax framework. The new package included a "side-by-side" agreement that essentially means U.S.-parented groups are exempt from Pillar Two minimum profits tax rules on the basis that they are already subject to a U.S. minimum tax.

== Impetus for the Framework tax proposal ==
Two factors spurred action on the OECD/G20 Inclusive Framework agreement. First, the growth of e-commerce has made it easier for goods and services to be sold in jurisdictions where businesses have no physical presence. Large multinational corporations, especially the "tech giants", have been able to reduce or avoid taxation using profit shifting, whereby they locate assets in a low-tax jurisdiction although the company may have little or no economic activity there. The OECD had previously brokered a multilateral clampdown on profit shifting after the 2008 financial crisis, which eliminated some of the "most egregious tricks" of "aggressive" tax avoidance.

Second, due to frustration that domestic media advertisers and retailers were losing ground to digital multinationals who paid little or no tax domestically, many countries introduced digital services taxes (DSTs). A DST is a tax on digital activities within a jurisdiction, which ensures that large digital enterprises pay tax in a country where their users and customers are located, even if they have no physical presence there. However, a DST may result in double taxation if, for example, the U.S. does not provide American companies with a tax credit for DST payments made abroad. Unlike a typical corporate income tax which is imposed on profits (revenue minus expenses), a DST is a tax on revenue.

== Allocating taxing rights over large multinational enterprises: Pillar One ==
The OECD global tax framework's Pillar One is designed to allocate taxing rights over large multinational enterprises to countries where they have a significant customer base, even if they have no physical presence. The agreement targets the largest multinational enterprises, with global revenues of €20 (US$20) billion or more, and a profit margin of over 10% (where profit margin is defined as profits as a percentage of revenue ).

Pillar One allocates 25% of "residual profit" (defined as profit in excess of 10% of revenue) to countries where an enterprise has at least €1 (US$1) million in revenue. Apportionment of profits would be based on revenues (such as sales of advertising) in each country. As part of the arrangement, all countries would eliminate digital services taxes.

Pillar One initially targeted only companies providing digital services, but the agreed-upon 2021 plan applies to all industries except financial and extractive industries. Hence, income of a firm exporting pharmaceuticals or manufactured goods could be taxed by the importing country. The agreement is a significant departure from traditional international tax rules which largely require a physical presence in a country before that country has a right to tax a corporation's profits. A 2021 study found 78 companies would be affected by Pillar One rules, with 37 of them from Europe. The study found a large proportion - 45% of the tax revenue allocation - would be from technology firms, with 85% of that from U.S. firms.

Implementation issues to be worked out after 2021 included how to calculate revenue sourcing; how to determine the carry-forward of losses; how to avoid double taxation; and how disputes would be resolved. Due to the complexity of implementation and disagreements over how profits should be allocated (especially by the United States which fears its tech giants will be disproportionately targeted), agreement on implementation was not reached by the self-imposed 30 June 2024 deadline. Nevertheless, the OECD says negotiations are ongoing.

== A global minimum corporate tax rate for large multinational enterprises: Pillar Two ==
Pillar Two introduces a common approach whereby governments pass legislation to impose a "global minimum tax" rate of 15% on multinational enterprises that have revenues above €750 million. It is designed to limit tax competition between countries and curb profit shifting by reducing the incentive for companies to move their income to tax havens. Approximately 2000 multinational enterprises are targeted. In 2024, around 55 countries had taken steps toward implementing the global minimum tax and around 40 of these had laws in place.

Many countries that have started Pillar Two implementation, including Britain, Japan, and some European countries, already tax companies at a rate above 15%, but the agreement allows them to start collecting "top-up" taxes. This means that if a country chooses a tax rate below the minimum, others can claim the difference. For example, with the global minimum tax rate set at 15%, American firms operating in Ireland would have to pay a 2.5% tax to the U.S. government, on top of the 12.5% rate paid to the Irish tax authorities if Ireland's tax rate was 12.5%. The top-up tax will not apply in any country with a domestic corporate income tax rate of at least 20% (which included the U.S. in 2024) until 2026. A tax law expert has described the global minimum corporate tax rate approach as "the most demanding tax regulation the world has ever seen on such a scale."

== Potential tax revenues and tax incidence ==
In 2023, the OECD estimated global corporate tax revenue would increase by $13-$36 billion per year under Pillar One (up from a 2020 estimate of $5-$12 billion). This amount is similar in magnitude to tax revenues collected from existing digital services taxes (DSTs) according to one report, although another study finds the UK's anticipated Pillar One revenue would likely be lower than the approximately US$400 million now generated annually by the country's 2% DST. While a DST is levied on digital services companies, evidence from sales taxes suggest that the tax incidence (i.e., the tax burden) of a DST is likely to be passed onto consumers in the country imposing the tax: that is, to domestic advertisers and online customers.

Under the Pillar Two agreement, the OECD says global corporate income tax revenues are estimated to increase by US$155 to US$192 billion each year (equivalent to between 6.5% and 8.1% of global corporate income tax revenues from 2017-2020), with two thirds of the gains attributed to top-up taxation, and one third to reduced profit shifting. For context, the five largest Silicon Valley giants paid $220 billion in taxes over the decade to 2021, or 16% of their cumulative pre-tax profits.

== Participation of the United States ==
The first Trump administration agreed with the idea of a minimum corporate income tax rate, and introduced a tax on global intangible low-taxed income (GILTI) on subsidiaries of U.S. multinationals. The Biden administration agreed with the principles of the OECD/G20 Inclusive Framework, and participated in negotiations.

Some members of the U.S. Congress have expressed concern that a DST may discriminate against American firms if it results in higher prices for consumers and/or imposes costs on U.S. firms, both of which could pose barriers to the export of U.S. digital services. In 2020 and 2021, the U.S. decided to levy tariffs against seven countries that applied digital services taxes (France, Austria, India, Italy, Spain, Turkey, and the UK), although these tariffs were suspended while Pillar One of the OECD/G20 Inclusive Framework was under consideration.

In January 2025, newly-elected President Donald Trump ordered the U.S. Treasury to prepare options for "protective measures" against countries that have - or are likely to - put in place tax rules that disproportionately affect American companies. The Trump administration also indicated it could apply Section 891 of the tax code (which has never been used) to double corporate taxes on companies from a country operating in the U.S. if that country was found to subject American corporations to discriminatory taxes, such as a top-up tax. These moves put both Pillars One and Two of the OECD/G20 Inclusive Framework in doubt since the agreements would likely not go forward without the U.S., which is home to several of the world’s largest companies and digital services providers.

On 5 January 2026 the OECD announced an agreement was negotiated by 147 countries and jurisdictions on the key elements of a "side-by-side" package whereby U.S.-parented groups would be exempt from Pillar Two minimum profits tax rules because they are already subject to a U.S. minimum tax. In June 2025, the G7 had agreed to a side-by-side system and the U.S. dropped a proposal in its "One Big Beautiful Bill Act" to impose an additional tax on individuals and entities from foreign countries that impose "discriminatory" taxes on U.S.-based companies, such as a global minimum tax, or a digital services tax.

== See also ==
- Base erosion and profit shifting
- Base erosion and profit shifting (OECD project)
- Corporate haven
- Digital services tax in Canada
- Global minimum corporate tax rate
- International taxation
- Taxation of digital goods
