= UTPR =

UTPR may refer to:

- Undertaxed Payment Rule
- USA Pickleball Tournament Player Rating
