= Global minimum tax on billionaires =

Proposed 2% tax on billionaires

The global minimum tax on billionaires is a proposal by EU TAX put forward by UC Berkeley economist Gabriel Zucman to the G20. It is supported by the Brazilian and French presidents, Lula and Emmanuel Macron, and by ministers from South Africa, Spain, France and Germany. The proposal is for a 2% wealth tax floor and draws inspiration from the 15% global minimum corporate income tax. The current effective tax rate on wealth held by billionaires is estimated to be just 0.3%.

== See also ==
- Race to the bottom
