= Digital Services Tax Act (Canada) =

Tax on digital services in Canada

Parliament of Canada
- Long title: An Act to implement certain provisions of the fall economic statement tabled in Parliament on November 21, 2023 and certain provisions of the budget tabled in Parliament on March 28, 2023
- Citation: S.C. 2024, c. 15, s. 96
- Assented to: 20 June 2024
- Commenced: In force 28 June 2024
- Repealed: 26 March 2026

Legislative history
- Bill title: Bill C-59
- Introduced by: Hon. Chrystia Freeland, Deputy Prime Minister and Minister of Finance

Canada's digital services tax (DST) was a 3% tax on Canadian-source digital services revenue (i.e., services that rely on engagement, data, and content contributions of Canadian users). The tax applied to foreign and Canadian firms with annual worldwide revenues of €750 million or more, and annual revenue greater than $20 million on Canadian-source digital services including online marketplaces, online advertising, social media, and user data services.

The Minister of Finance announced plans to implement a DST in November 2020, saying a robust tax base requires "those who do business in Canada paying their fair share of tax." The DST entered into force on 28 June 2024. It applied to revenue earned from 1 January 2022, with first tax payments due by 30 June 2025.

The Canadian DST was modelled after similar taxes implemented by other countries, including France and the UK. The Parliamentary Budget Officer estimated that the DST would raise revenues of $7.2 billion from 2023 to 2027.

The U.S. Trade Representative requested dispute-settlement consultations under the United States-Mexico-Canada Agreement (CUSMA) in August 2024, saying Canada's DST discriminated against American firms. On 29 June 2025 Canada announced it would repeal the DST. This prompted a restart of trade negotiations with the United States, as President Trump had said that talks were being suspended because of Canada's plan to implement the tax.

== Background ==
A substantial proportion—approximately 70% of Canadian advertising expenditures (comprising $13.5 billion) -- was paid to foreign-owned digital media in 2022. Since the 1970s, Section 19 of Canada's Income Tax Act has said advertising expenditure on foreign-owned radio, television, or print media is not deductible for tax purposes. In 2023, the Canadian government considered modernizing this legislation to incorporate digital media, a move that Friends of Canadian Broadcasting, News Media Canada, and others said was long overdue since it would steer advertising dollars toward Canadian-owned media.

Both a DST and a modernized Section 19 would generate additional tax revenue when firms advertise with foreign digital companies. However, according to Louis Audet, the CEO of Quebec telecommunications company Cogeco, an advantage of a modernized Article 19 is that the legislation would not be subject to U.S. challenges under the USMCA, in contrast to Canada's DST which was targeted by the U.S. Trade Representative in August 2024.

== Main features and implementation ==
Canada's digital services tax (DST) was a 3% tax on Canadian digital services revenue arising from online marketplace, advertising, and social media services; and from the sale or licensing of user data. Digital services are considered "Canadian" if they rely on engagement, data, and content contributions of Canadian users, and sales or licensing of Canadian user data. (For example, online advertising services revenue is calculated based on a formula that considers the location of the targeted user. Online marketplace services revenue is calculated based on services physically performed in Canada.)

Foreign and Canadian firms would be subject to the DST if they had annual worldwide revenue of €750 million or more, and annual revenue greater than $20 million on Canadian digital services.

The DST entered into force on 28 June 2024, and digital services providers were to register with the Canada Revenue Agency by 31 January 2025. First payments were due by 30 June 2025, but the tax was retroactive to 1 January 2022 because the government held off enacting the legislation in the hope that the multinational OECD/G20 Inclusive Framework agreement on corporate taxes would be reached.

Google began implementing a 2.5% surcharge for ads in Canada on 1 October 2024, to cover the cost of the DST. Canadian advertisers on Amazon became subject to a digital services fee of 3% as of October 2024.

The Parliamentary Budget Officer estimated that the DST would raise revenues of $7.2 billion from 2023 to 2027. The U.S. said Canada's DST would lead to payments by American companies of US$500 million annually.

== Comparison with digital services taxes in other countries ==
Many countries have introduced digital services taxes to ensure that global digital corporations (i.e., "Big tech") pay tax in the jurisdictions where their users and customers are located. A digital business may derive income from a country but, without a physical presence there, is not subject to corporate income tax in that country. Unlike typical corporate income taxes which are imposed on profits (i.e., revenue minus expenses), DSTs are a tax on revenue derived from the sale of digital goods and services in the jurisdiction imposing the tax.

In 2024, eighteen countries had implemented a DST, including eleven European states (Austria, Denmark, France, Hungary, Italy, Poland, Portugal, Spain, Switzerland, Turkey and the United Kingdom), with rates that vary from 1.5% in Poland to 7.5% in Turkey. The Canadian DST is modelled after similar taxes implemented by other countries, including France and the UK. France's 3% DST has a tax base that is broader than that of most European countries, and includes revenues from targeted advertising, and the transmission of data collected about users for advertising purposes. Activities covered by the UK's 2% DST (which raised £358 million in its first year, 2020–21), include online search engines, social media platforms, and online marketplaces.

After Spain, the UK, and France proposed DSTs in 2018, the U.S. began an investigation under Section 301 of the Trade Act of 1974 of the French DST, which it viewed as targeting American firms. In 2020 and 2021, the U.S. announced and then suspended tariffs on seven countries (France, Austria, India, Italy, Spain, Turkey, the UK) while negotiations continued on the OECD/G20 Inclusive Framework, a plan to develop an international digital tax framework (also called "Pillar 1"). In July 2023, 138 of the 145 Framework members agreed to hold off on imposing DSTs until at least 2025 to allow for additional negotiations, but Canada dissented, saying it would not support a DST moratorium without a “firm and binding” timeline for Framework implementation. The U.S. has stated that it would assess a Canadian DST against the same standard as the previous DST investigations which were terminated temporarily following the October 2021 OECD/G20 Inclusive Framework announcement.

== Opposition in Canada ==
The Canadian Chamber of Commerce opposed the DST, saying it would "make life more expensive for Canadian families, businesses and workers" and that it would "significantly harm our relationship with the United States."

The Centre for Canadian Innovation and Competitiveness said the DST would have harmful effects on Canadian businesses, startups, and consumers because it would lead to reduced services and/or higher prices for digital services in Canada, since it is a tax on revenue (rather than on profits).

== U.S. opposition to Canada’s DST ==
The U.S. Chamber of Commerce and the American Chamber of Commerce in Canada said Canada's DST legislation would raise prices, and that the tax would disproportionately hit U.S. companies and violate Canada's obligations under the United States-Mexico-Canada Agreement (USMCA). In August 2024 the Biden administration stated that it considered Canada's DST discriminatory, and requested dispute settlement consultations under the USMCA.

Some members of Congress expressed concern that Canada's DST could result in higher prices for Canadian consumers and/or impose costs on U.S. firms, both of which may pose barriers to the export of U.S. digital services to Canada. A study for the U.S. Congress says a DST is most likely to be passed on to advertisers in the country that imposes the tax and those advertisers are, in turn, likely to pass on the cost to their customers.

On his first day in office, President Donald Trump ordered the U.S. Treasury to prepare options for "protective measures" against countries that have - or are likely to - put in place tax rules that disproportionately affect American companies. This put the Pillar 1 OECD/G20 Inclusive Framework in doubt since talks had been stalled, and the agreement would likely not go forward without the U.S. which is home to several of the world's largest digital services providers. Also, in January 2025 the Trump administration indicated it could use Section 891 of the tax code (which has never been used) to double corporate taxes on Canadian companies operating in the U.S. if Canada was found to subject U.S. corporations to discriminatory taxes.

== Repeal of the DST ==
On June 27, 2025, President Trump said trade talks with Canada were being suspended because of Canada's plans to implement the digital services tax. U.S. Treasury Secretary Scott Bessent said that, while several countries in the EU have digital services taxes, "None of them have done those retroactively". Trade talks were restarted on June 30, 2025 after the Canadian government rescinded the DST. Legislation to repeal the DST was contained in the budget bill that received royal assent on 26 March 2026, and the Canada Revenue Agency said it would make refunds on amounts it had collected before the tax was cancelled. Approximately 23% of the $647 million in refunds went to U.S.-based businesses. In turn, by April 2026, Google said it had started issuing credits to its advertising services customers who were charged a 2.5% DST fee from October 2024 to June 2025; and Amazon said it would refund the 3% DST-related fee it had collected from sellers and Amazon Ads purchasers.

== See also ==
- OECD/G20 Inclusive Framework
- Taxation of digital goods
- Taxation in Canada
