= Base erosion and profit shifting (OECD project) =

2012 OECD project to combat BEPS

"It is hard to imagine any business, under the current [Irish] IP regime, which could not generate substantial intangible assets under Irish GAAP that would be eligible for relief under [the Irish] capital allowances [for intangible assets scheme]." "This puts the attractive 2.5% Irish IP-tax rate within reach of almost any global business that relocates to Ireland."

— KPMG, "Intellectual Property Tax", 4 December 2017

Of the wider tax environment, O'Rourke thinks the OECD base-erosion and profit-shifting (BEPS) process is "very good" for Ireland. "If BEPS sees itself to a conclusion, it will be good for Ireland."

— Feargal O'Rourke CEO PwC (Ireland)
"Architect" of the double Irish
The Irish Times, 2015

The OECD G20 Base Erosion and Profit Shifting Project (or BEPS Project) is an OECD/G20 project to set up an international framework to combat tax avoidance by multinational enterprises ("MNEs") using base erosion and profit shifting tools. The project, led by the OECD's Committee on Fiscal Affairs, began in 2013 with OECD and G20 countries, in a context of financial crisis and tax affairs (e.g. Offshore Leaks). Currently, after the BEPS report has been delivered in 2015, the project is now in its implementation phase, 116 countries are involved including a majority of developing countries. During two years, the package was developed by participating members on an equal footing, as well as widespread consultations with jurisdictions and stakeholders, including business, academics and civil society. And since 2016, the OECD/G20 Inclusive Framework on BEPS provides for its 140 members a platform to work on an equal footing to tackle BEPS, including through peer review of the BEPS minimum standards, and monitoring of implementation of the BEPS package as a whole.

The BEPS project looks to develop multilateral dialogue and could be achieved thanks to a successful international cooperation, unavoidable when it comes to such a domestic and sovereign topic. It is one of the instances of the OECD that involves developing countries in its process. The European Commission and the US have unilaterally taken actions in 2017-2018 that implement several key measures of the BEPS project, even going beyond in some cases.

== Content ==
=== Project aim ===
The aim of the project is to mitigate tax code loopholes and country-to-country inconsistencies so that corporations cannot shift profits from a country with a high corporate tax rate to countries with a low tax rate. The practice - in particular double non-taxation - is usually legal but often involves complex manoeuvres within tax law. BEPS is costly for all parties involved, save the firm. The citizens' trust in tax systems can be harmed by widespread tax avoidance practices, which puts at stake fiscal consent a concept at the core of modern democracies; it is also a loss of revenues for the State. A conservative estimate has annual tax revenue losses between 100 and US$240 billion (i.e. 4-10% of global revenues from corporate income tax) due to profit shifting around the globe. A study by the Tax Justice Network estimated that around US$660 billion of corporate profits were shifted in 2012. In developed countries like those comprising the OECD, BEPS undermines the integrity of tax systems. In developing countries, where there is heavy reliance on corporate taxes, revenues are trimmed, leaving states underfunded and underinvested.

Furthermore, the project serves as an alternative to the deterioration of international tax norms. The project's Action Plan states that a failure to address BEPS would spawn "the emergence of competing sets of international standards, and the replacement of the current consensus-based framework by unilateral measures, which could lead to global tax chaos marked by the massive re-emergence of double taxation. In this respect, the BEPS project serves as an example of cooperation in game theory. The project prevents both double taxation and double non-taxation, as well as countries undercutting others by lowering tax rates to attract business. Countries cooperating yields a better outcome than non-cooperation.

=== Inclusive Framework ===
In October 2015, after two years of negotiations and development, a 15-point Action Plan was announced by the OECD and G20 to address BEPS. The Inclusive Framework was established in 2016, it was deemed necessary that for an effective international tax framework, developing countries must be involved. To gain membership, non-OECD/G20 countries must commit to the BEPS package, a plan to "equip government with domestic and international instruments to address tax avoidance, ensuring that profits are taxed where economic activities generating the profits are performed and where value is created." All countries in the framework work on equal footing to implement the BEPS package. The package consists of 15 action plans that provide tax standards in exchange for a membership fee (discounted for developing countries). As of May 2018, 116 countries had signed on to the project.

=== BEPS achievements ===
During its ongoing implementation and as of July 2018, the BEPS project of the OECD allowed to achieve the following realisations:

- The Inclusive Framework on BEPS brings 142 countries and jurisdictions participating on an equal footing in the Project, representing over 95% of the global GDP (inc. some well-known financial centers).
- 175 regimes have been reviewed and more than 130 regimes have already been amended or abolished or are in the process of being amended or abolished, moreover information on 17 000 tax rulings have already been identified and exchanged.
- Measures to fight BEPS were included in 1,400 treaties, through the MLI.
- Almost 50 jurisdictions started to automatically exchange financial account information in September 2017 and more than 50 will begin in September 2018. The first annual peer review report of Action 13 (Country-by-Country Reporting), contains a comprehensive examination of 95 jurisdictions.
- By July 2018, US$414 million of additional revenues have been raised with costs of less than US$4 million through the Tax Inspectors Without Borders (TIWB) initiative. Since 2012, TIWB completed 7 projects, 31 are currently operational, and there are 23 in the pipeline in Africa, Asia Pacific, Latin America and Caribbean, and Eastern Europe.

=== BEPS examples ===
A spate of BEPS scandals in the past decade has served as an impetus for the OECD's action. The largest firms are often U.S. multinationals avoiding the high (35%) worldwide corporate tax rate in the United States. However BEPS tools (and structuring) are also increasingly used in money laundering/regulatory avoidance. The following are prominent examples of the leading BEPS tools in operation today:

1. Double Irish is a BEPS scheme used by U.S. corporations in Ireland (incl. Apple, Google and Facebook), to shield non-U.S. income from the pre TCJA U.S. worldwide 35% tax system, and almost all Irish taxes. As the BEPS scheme used to build offshore reserves of $1 trillion, it is the largest tax avoidance structure in history.
2. Single malt is another BEPS tax scheme designed to replicate the double Irish, which is impossible after 2020. It relies on specific wording in bi-lateral Irish tax treaties (particularly with Malta and the United Arab Emirates) to re-create the double Irish system and its effective tax rate of <1%. Single malt is used by Microsoft and Allergan in Ireland.
3. Capital allowances for intangible assets is Ireland's long-term replacement for double Irish and single malt. It delivers an effective tax rate of 0-3%. When Apple, the largest user of BEPS tools globally, restructured its controversial double Irish subsidiary in 2015 (as agreed with the EU Commission), it chose the capital allowances for intangible assets scheme. Accenture used it in 2009.
4. Corporate tax inversions are the original BEPS tools. Despite most activity being in the U.S., heavy machinery manufacturer Caterpillar Inc. shifted profits to Switzerland, where its effective tax rate was 4-6%, saving $2.4 billion from 2002-2012. By combining the capital allowances for intangible assets scheme with an Irish corporate tax inversion, Ireland has become the leading destination for U.S. firms.
5. Securitization SPVs are an emerging new BEPS tool. Structures such as the Section 110 SPV are being used to create more advanced artificial loan structures, which are harder to understand and prevent, for BEPS-type activities (including money laundering/regulatory avoidance purposes). There has been a material uplift in Section 110 SPVs by sanctioned Russian financial institutions.

== Structure ==
The BEPS project consists of 15 action plans with 4 minimum standards, agreed to by all participating countries who have committed to consistent implementation.

Some measures can be used immediately, others require renegotiating bilateral tax treaties.

Action 1: Address the Digital Economy

- The BEPS project recommends avoiding new direct taxes on digital activity, and expects other Actions to be generalized to tackle the digital economy as well.
- For indirect taxes, a shift to tax collection in the jurisdiction of consumption is recommended.
- This Action also paves the way for more taxes to be collected on low-value e-commerce transactions by shifting value added tax obligations to the vendor.

Action 2: Hybrids

- Advises the creation of domestic mismatching rules, which addresses the different treatment of corporate taxable activity by nations.
- Recommends tax treaty provisions that eliminate issues like double nontaxation or double deduction.

Action 3: Controlled Foreign Companies (CFC) Rules

- Seeks to establish a standard definition of a CFC and its income, and proposes rules that eliminate mismatches or holes that allow CFCs to shift income elsewhere.

Action 4: Interest Deductions

- Outlines a common approach to end base erosion by interest deduction rules for eligible MNEs.
- Suggests rules that account for a firm's debt level and interest deductions, creating a ratio standard that prevents MNE from favorable tax deductions.

Action 5: Harmful Tax Practices (minimum standard)

- Allows for a methodology that assesses harmful tax practices, like preferential regimes.
- Creates a framework for compulsory spontaneous exchange of information regarding tax rulings and practices.

Action 6: Treaty Abuse (minimum standard)

- Creates several provisions for a minimum standard to combat treaty shopping that all participating countries have agreed to implement.
- Suggests specific anti-abuse rules be included in domestic legislation.

Action 7: Permanent Establishment Status

- Greatly expands the definition of a permanent establishment to counter MNE tactics used to avoid having a taxable presence in a country.

Actions 8-10: Transfer Pricing

- Moves to align transfer pricing outcomes with value creation.
- Creates stronger guidelines to transactions involving the transfer pricing of intangibles and contractual arrangements.

Action 11: BEPS Data Analysis

- Establishes the synchronization of data collection, which indicators to look to, and methodologies to analyze data.

Action 12: Disclosure of Aggressive Tax Planning

- Recommends mandatory disclosure of aggressive tax planning to increase transparency.

Action 13: Transfer Pricing Documentation (minimum standard)

- Guidelines for documentation of transfer pricing, including country-to-country disclosure.

Action 14: Dispute Resolution(minimum standard)

- Stipulates minimum standards for treaty disputes and arbitration.

Action 15: Multilateral Instrument

- Lays out the legal and technical difficulties the BEPS project faces in its mission to create a multilateral tax framework. The Instrument is called Multilateral Convention to Implement Tax Treaty Related Measures to Prevent Base Erosion and Profit Shifting and entered into force on 1 July 2018.

== Other initiatives ==
In 2017–2018, both the U.S. and the European Commission decided to depart from the OECD BEPS process and timetable, and launch their own anti-BEPS tax regimes:

- U.S. Tax Cuts and Jobs Act of 2017, which has several anti-BEPS regimes, including GILTI tax and interest deductibility limits.
- EU Commission 2018 Digital Services Tax, which is less advanced than the U.S. TCJA, but does seek to impose a minimum tax rate via a quasi-VAT.

The departure of the U.S. and EU Commission from the OECD BEPS project is attributed to frustrations with the rise in intellectual property (or IP), as a key BEPS tool to create intangible assets, which are then turned into royalty payment BEPS schemes (double Irish), and/or capital allowance BEPS schemes (capital allowances for intangibles). In contrast, the OECD has spent decades developing intellectual property as a legal and a GAAP accounting concept.

Ireland, who has some of the most advanced IP-based BEPS tools in the world, and have the first OECD-approved IP-box, has been a supporter of the OECD BEPS project (see Feargal O'Rourke quote). Ireland's capital allowances for intangibles scheme was the BEPS structure to secure it as an ultra-low tax (i.e. 0-3% in perpuity) location for U.S. multinationals, that is in full compliance with all OECD guidelines, and the OECD BEPS project.

However, the U.S. and EU's new tax regimes deliberately "override" these IP-based BEPS tools.

Ireland has opened a new line of Debt-based BEPS tools which use securitization vehicles to create advanced artificial loan structures that are hard to understand and track in the $10 trillion global securitisation sector (the securitization orphan structure approach also hides their ownership). Main tool is the Section 110 SPV.

== See also ==
- Conduit and Sink OFCs
- Double Irish, Single Malt, and Capital Allowances for Intangible Assets
- Corporation tax in the Republic of Ireland
- Irish Section 110 Special Purpose Vehicle (SPV)
- OECD/G20 Inclusive Framework
