= UN Framework Convention on International Tax Cooperation =

United Nations body (proposed)

Ad Hoc Committee to Draft Terms of Reference for a United Nations Framework Convention on International Tax Cooperation
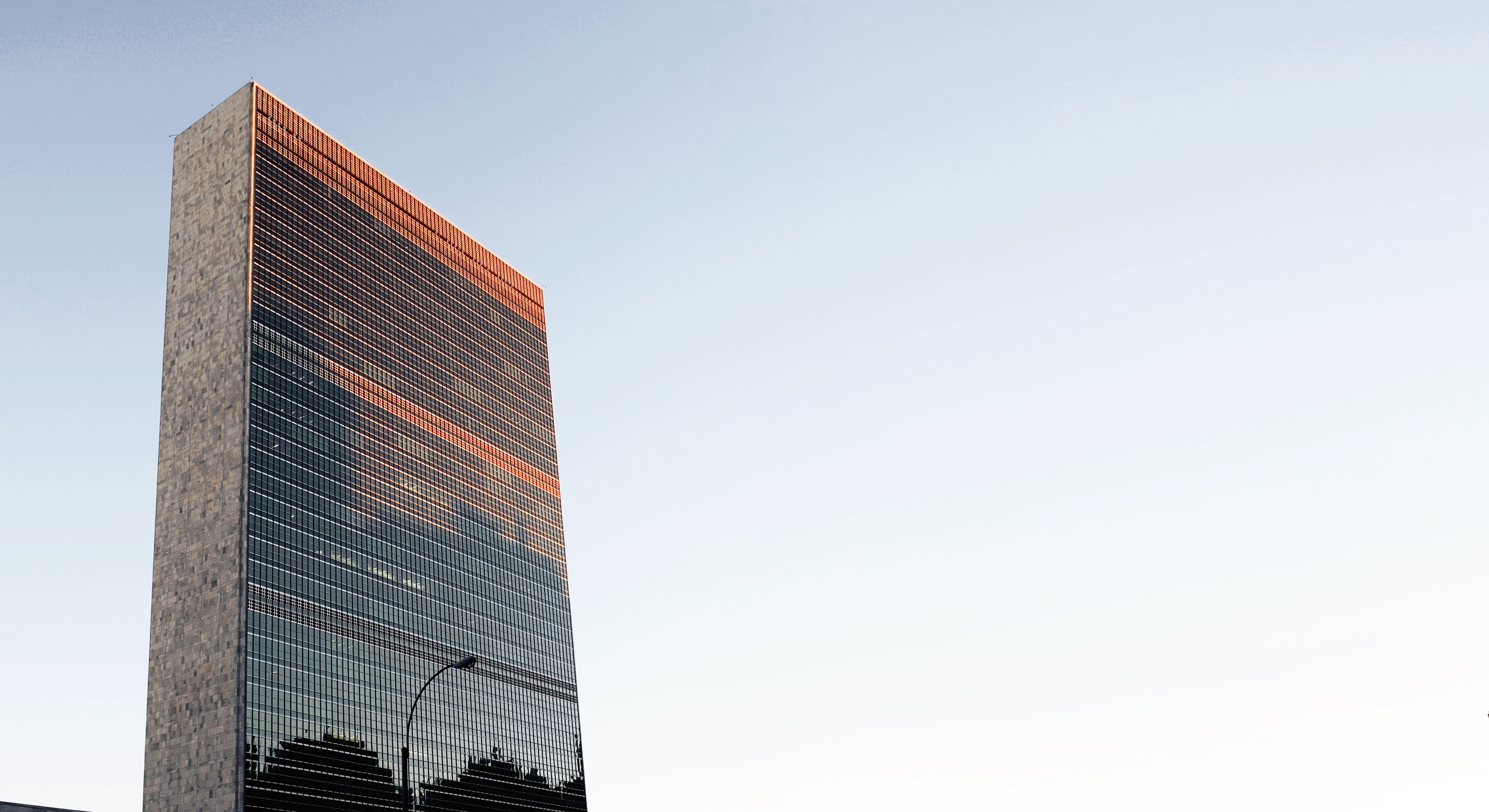
- Formation: 2024
- Headquarters: New York
- Website: financing.desa.un.org/un-tax-convention

The United Nations Framework Convention on International Tax Cooperation is a proposed new legal instrument intended to better coordinate international tax policy. Championed by developing countries, a UN framework tax convention aims at reforming international tax cooperation.

Addressing international tax cooperation at the UN would contribute to other UN competencies, in particular with regard to the Sustainable Development Goals (SDGs).

Under Resolution 78/230 of 22 December 2023, the General Assembly established an Ad Hoc Committee to draft the terms of reference for a UN Framework Convention on International Tax Cooperation by August 2024.
