= Multilateral Convention to Implement Tax Treaty Related Measures to Prevent Base Erosion and Profit Shifting =

- Signatories (blue) and Parties (orange) to the convention and Expression of Intent (pink)
- Signed: 7 June 2017
- Location: Paris, France
- Effective: 1 July 2018
- Condition: 19 ratifications
- Signatories: 107
- Parties: 91
- Depositary: Secretary-General of the Organisation for Economic Co-operation and Development
- Languages: English and French

The Multilateral Convention to Implement Tax Treaty Related Measures to Prevent Base Erosion and Profit Shifting, sometime abbreviated BEPS multilateral instrument, is a multilateral convention of the Organisation for Economic Co-operation and Development to combat tax avoidance by multinational enterprises (MNEs) through prevention of Base Erosion and Profit Shifting (BEPS). The BEPS multilateral instrument was negotiated within the framework of the OECD G20 BEPS project and enables countries and jurisdictions to swiftly modify their bilateral tax treaties to implement some of the measures agreed.

The substance of the tax treaty-related BEPS measures (under BEPS Actions 2, 6, 7 and 14) was agreed as part of the Final BEPS Package. Accordingly, the negotiation on the text of the BEPS multilateral instrument was focused on how the BEPS multilateral instrument would need to modify the provisions of bilateral or regional tax agreements in order to implement those BEPS measures.

The BEPS multilateral instrument was adopted on 24 November 2016 and signed on 7 June 2017 by 67 jurisdictions for the first signing ceremony. As of July 2018, 83 jurisdictions have signed the BEPS multilateral instrument, covering more than 1,400 bilateral tax treaties. It entered into force on 1 July 2018, among the first jurisdictions that ratified it.

== Functioning ==
The BEPS multilateral instrument looks to "prevent treaty abuse, improve dispute resolution, prevent the artificial avoidance of permanent establishment status and neutralise the effects of hybrid mismatch arrangements". The BEPS multilateral instrument does not function in the same way as an amending protocol to a single existing treaty, which would directly amend the text of the existing tax treaty. Instead, it applies alongside the existing tax treaties. As stated in the Explanatory Statement of the BEPS multilateral instrument this reflects the ordinary rule of treaty interpretation, as reflected in Article 30(3) of the Vienna Convention on the Law of Treaties, under which an earlier treaty between parties that are also parties to a later treaty will apply only to the extent that its provisions are compatible with those of the later treaty. With one convention, the signatory countries can achieve a work that would have taken decades otherwise.

Consistent with the purpose of the BEPS multilateral instrument, which is to swiftly implement the tax treaty-related BEPS measures, the BEPS multilateral instrument also enables all parties to meet 2 of the 4 minimum standards which were agreed as part of the Final BEPS package. Given, however, that each of those minimum standards can be satisfied in multiple different ways, and given the broad range of countries and jurisdictions involved in the development of the BEPS multilateral instrument, the BEPS multilateral instrument gives flexibilities with respect to ways of meeting it while remaining consistent with its purpose. The BEPS multilateral instrument also provides flexibility by allowing to opt out of provisions which do not reflect a BEPS minimum standard.

== Parties ==
A list of ratified parties to the convention is shown below (as of November 2026). Of the 107 jurisdictions covered, 91 have deposited their instrument of ratification, approval or acceptance.

Jurisdiction	Date of entry into force
Albania	1 January 2021
Andorra	1 January 2022
Argentina	1 January 2026
Armenia	1 January 2024
Australia	1 January 2019
Austria	1 July 2018
Azerbaijan	1 January 2025
Bahrain	1 June 2022
Barbados	1 April 2021
Belgium	1 October 2019
Belize	1 August 2022
Bosnia and Herzegovina	1 January 2021
Bulgaria	1 January 2023
Burkina Faso	1 February 2021
Cameroon	1 August 2022
Canada	1 December 2019
Chile	1 March 2021
China	1 September 2022
Costa Rica	1 January 2021
Croatia	1 June 2021
Curaçao	1 July 2019
Cyprus	1 May 2020
Czech	1 September 2020
Denmark	1 January 2020
Egypt	1 January 2021
Estonia	1 May 2021
Finland	1 June 2019
France	1 January 2019
Georgia	1 July 2019
Germany	1 April 2021
Greece	1 July 2021
Guernsey	1 June 2019
Hong Kong	1 September 2022
Hungary	1 July 2021
Iceland	1 January 2020
India	1 October 2019
Indonesia	1 August 2020
Ireland	1 May 2019
Isle of Man	1 July 2018
Israel	1 January 2019
Ivory Coast	1 January 2024
Japan	1 January 2019
Jersey	1 July 2018
Jordan	1 January 2021
Kazakhstan	1 October 2020
Kenya	1 May 2025
South Korea	1 September 2020
Latvia	1 February 2020
Lesotho	1 November 2022
Liechtenstein	1 April 2020
Lithuania	1 January 2019
Luxembourg	1 August 2019
Malaysia	1 June 2021
Malta	1 April 2019
Mauritius	1 February 2020
Mexico	1 July 2023
Monaco	1 May 2019
Mongolia	1 January 2025
Montenegro	1 September 2026
Netherlands	1 July 2019
New Zealand	1 October 2018
Norway	1 November 2019
Oman	1 November 2020
Pakistan	1 April 2021
Panama	1 March 2021
Papua New Guinea	1 December 2023
Peru	1 October 2025
Poland	1 July 2018
Portugal	1 June 2020
Qatar	1 April 2020
Romania	1 June 2022
Russia	1 October 2019
San Marino	1 July 2020
Saudi Arabia	1 May 2020
Senegal	1 September 2022
Serbia	1 October 2018
Seychelles	1 April 2022
Singapore	1 April 2019
Slovakia	1 January 2019
Slovenia	1 July 2018
South Africa	1 January 2023
Spain	1 January 2022
Sweden	1 October 2018
Switzerland	1 December 2019
Thailand	1 July 2022
Tunisia	1 November 2023
Ukraine	1 December 2019
United Arab Emirates	1 September 2019
United Kingdom	1 October 2018
Uruguay	1 June 2020
Vietnam	1 September 2023

== See also ==
- Base erosion and profit shifting
