= Leprechaun economics =

Term used to describe a distortion of Ireland's GDP by Apple Inc restructuring

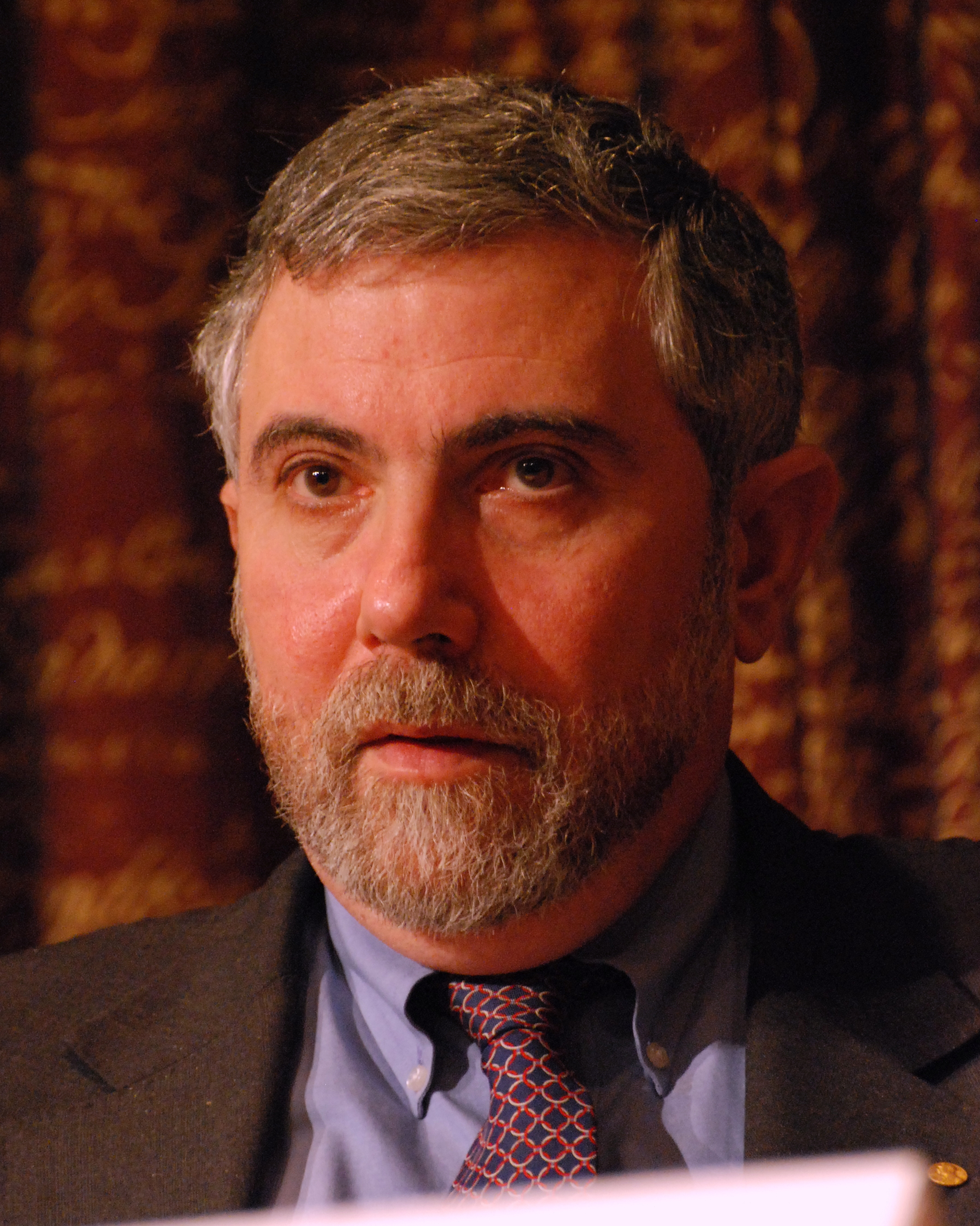
Nobel Prize-winning American economist Paul Krugman, whose tweet on 12 July 2016 used the term "leprechaun economics".

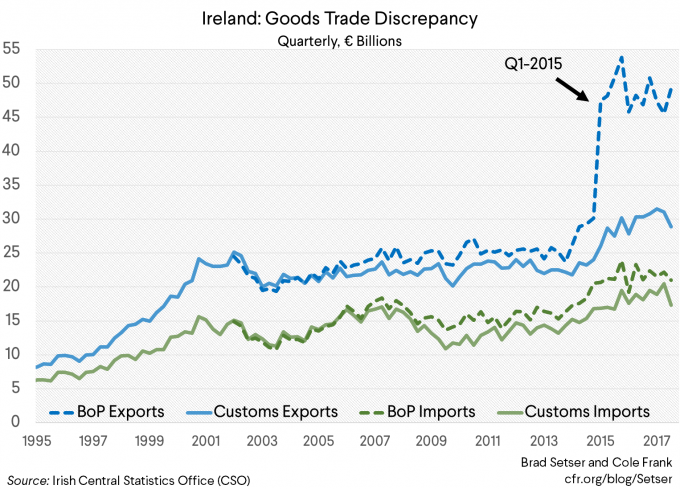
Leprechaun economics: Apple's Q1 2015 USD 300 billion tax inversion of its non–U.S. business was the largest ever BEPS action, and double the blocked 2016 USD 160 billion Pfizer–Allergan inversion.

Leprechaun economics (Irish: eacnamaíocht Leipreacháin) was a term coined by economist Paul Krugman to describe the 26.3 per cent rise in Irish 2015 GDP, later revised to 24.6 per cent, (Note: Though commonly asserted, it is incorrect to suggest the upward revision was to 34%; this confuses value and volume measures of Ireland's GDP growth in 2015. In July 2016, 2015 GDP growth was estimated at +26.3% volume and +32.4% value, as shown in National Income and Expenditure 2015; https://www.cso.ie/en/releasesandpublications/er/nie/nationalincomeandexpenditureannualresults2015/. The latest estimates in the Annual National Accounts 2024 show +24.6% volume and +35.7% value; https://data.cso.ie/table/NA007.) in a 12 July 2016 publication by the Irish Central Statistics Office (CSO), restating 2015 Irish national accounts. At that point, the distortion of Irish economic data by tax-driven accounting flows reached a climax. In 2020, Krugman said the term was a feature of all tax havens.

While the event that caused the artificial Irish GDP growth occurred in Q1 2015, the Irish CSO had to delay its GDP revision and redact the release of its regular economic data in 2016–2017 to protect the source's identity, as required by Irish law. Only in Q1 2018 could economists confirm Apple as the source, and that this was the largest ever base erosion and profit shifting (BEPS) action, and the largest hybrid–tax inversion of a U.S. corporation.

The event marked the replacement of Ireland's prohibited BEPS tool, the Double Irish, with the more powerful Capital Allowances for Intangible Assets (CAIA) tool. Apple used the CAIA tool to restructure out of its hybrid–Double Irish tool, on which the EU Commission would levy a €13 billion fine in August 2016. (Note: From a 9 January 2015 meeting with the EU Commission which was documented when the EU Commission published their full decision (S.A 38373), page 42 section 2.5.7 Apple's new corporate structure in Ireland as of 2015.) As a result of the action by Apple, a range of academics calculated that Ireland, already held by some to be a major tax haven, was the world's largest tax haven.

The "Leprechaun economics" incident had follow-on effects. In September 2016, Ireland became the first of the major tax havens to be "blacklisted" by a G20 economy, Brazil. In February 2017, Ireland replaced GDP with "Modified GNI (or GNI*)" (2017 Irish GDP was 162% of 2017 Irish GNI*, whereas EU–28 2017 GDP was 100% of GNI). In December 2017, the U.S. and the EU introduced countermeasures to the Irish BEPS tools. In October 2018, Ireland introduced a reverse tax, to discourage IP from leaving Ireland. In 2018, the OECD showed that Ireland's public debt metrics differ dramatically depending on whether Debt-to-GDP, Debt-to-GNI* or Debt-per-Capita is used; and in 2019, the IMF estimated 60 per cent of Irish foreign direct investment was "phantom".

== Naming and use ==
=== 2015 GDP data ===
On the 12 July 2016, at 11am GMT, the Central Statistics Office posted a data revision showing that 2015 Irish GDP data rose by 26.3 per cent and 2015 Irish GNP rose by 18.7 per cent. Twenty four minutes later, at 11.24am GMT, Nobel Prize-winning economist Paul Krugman responded to the data release by posting:

Leprechaun economics: Ireland reports 26 percent growth! But it doesn't make sense. Why are these in GDP?

— Paul Krugman, 12 July 2016

From 12 to 13 July 2016, the term leprechaun economics was used widely by the Irish and international media when discussing Ireland's revised 26.3% 2015 GDP growth rate. Leprechaun economics became a label for the Irish 2015 GDP 26.3% growth rate, and has been as such by a diverse range of sources. In December 2019, the Irish Times named "Leprechaun Economics" as one of its "Top 10 business stories of the decade".

=== Irish economy ===
Since July 2016, "leprechaun economics" has become used by economists in relation to caveats and concerns regarding Irish economic data.

Nobody believes our GDP numbers any more, not after a 26 per cent jump in 2015, which was famously derided as "leprechaun economics". Even the CSO cautions against viewing last year's [2017] 7.8 per cent jump as a reflection of real economic activity

— The Irish Times, 17 March 2018

In March 2018, the first paper was published in an established international economic journal, in this case the New Political Economy - with leprechaun economics in its title: "Celtic Phoenix or Leprechaun Economics? The Politics of an FDI-led Growth Model in Europe". By September 2018, the term leprechaun economics had been used 83 times during debates in the Irish Dáil Éireann.

In September 2019, former Northern Ireland minister Nelson McCausland, criticised Ireland's reliance on tax-driven schemes for economic growth, which he referred to as Leprechaun economics, in an opinion piece for The Belfast Telegraph titled: "Northern Ireland will prosper once it’s rid of the EU... not by being tied to 'economics of the leprechaun'".

=== Wider use ===
Since July 2016, "leprechaun economics" has also been used many times (including by Krugman himself), to refer to distorted or unsound economic data outside Ireland, including by:

1. Krugman, in relation to the effects of the US Tax Cuts and Jobs Act
2. Krugman, in relation to national statistics from some Eastern European Countries
3. Irish Times, in relation to Irish house building completion statistics
4. Bloomberg, in relation to US economic data and in particular, US trade deficit figures
5. U.S. Council on Foreign Relations, in relation to the increasing distortion of EU–28 economic data by Ireland and the Netherlands

In January 2020, Krugman noted in the New York Times the more general application of the term, saying: "Now, I've coined a few economic phrases I'm proud of: "leprechaun economics" for the distortion of statistics caused by multinational corporations in search of tax havens, ..."; and followed with tweet saying: "You know what's really gratifying as a commentator? When a phrase you coined (leprechaun economics) is widely used without attribution. No, really — it means you've changed the discourse".

=== Controversy ===
In June 2021, the Irish Ambassador to the US, Daniel Mulhall, wrote a letter to the New York Times saying, "This is not the first time your columnist has used the word 'leprechaun' when referring to Ireland, and I see it as my duty to point out that this represents an unacceptable slur."

== Obfuscation of source (2016) ==
=== Statistics Act ===
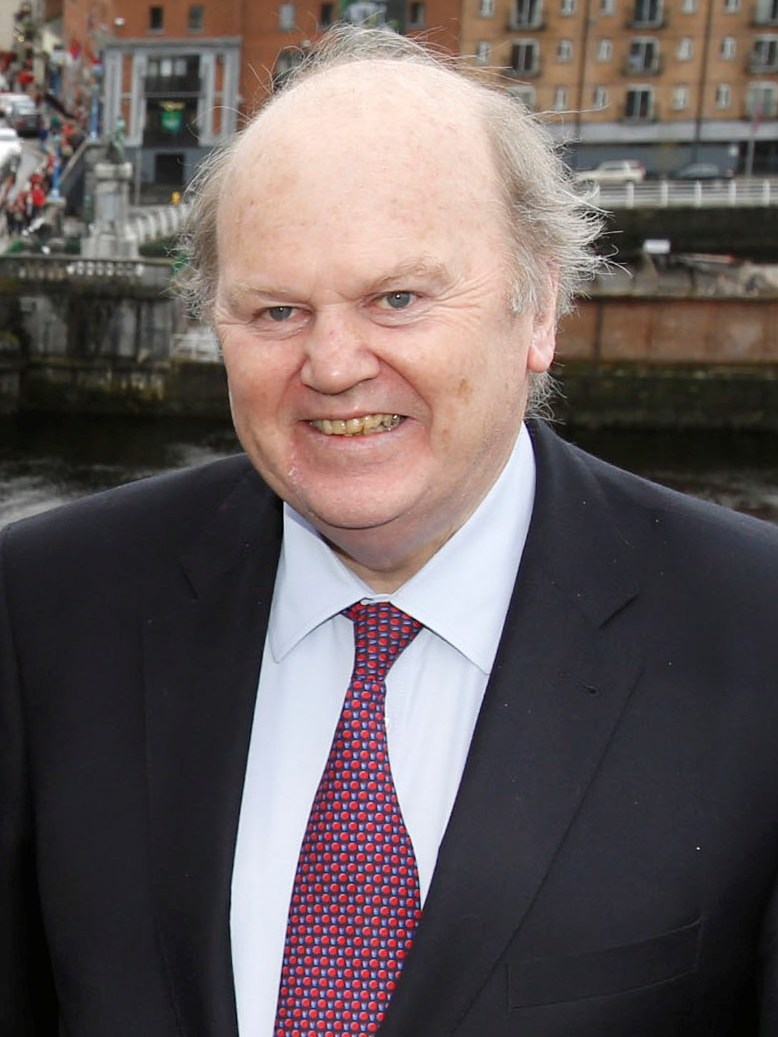
In July 2016, Irish Finance Minister Michael Noonan attributed "leprechaun economics" to a range of multinationals restructuring pre the closure of the Double Irish BEPS tool, and aircraft leasing transactions. (Note: In May 2019, the Irish Independent would report figures from the Department of Finance showing that since 2012, the net assets (e.g. a figure which would contribute to Irish GDP) of the aircraft leasing industry in Ireland was close to zero. They also reported that the revenues of aircraft leasing in Ireland only increased by €2.4 billion in 2015 (also a figure which would contribute to Irish GDP), versus the €67.4 billion increase from Leprechaun economics.)

Despite the scale of the revision to 2015 Irish GDP, the Irish Central Statistics Office issued a short one-page note on 12 July 2016 explaining that it was as a result of an annual benchmarking exercise. The office also stated that: "As a consequence of the overall scale of these additions, elements of the results that would previously been published are now suppressed to protect the confidentiality of the contributing companies, in accordance with the Statistics Act 1993."

On the 12 July 2016, the Irish State attributed the 2015 growth revision to a combination of factors, including aircraft purchases (Ireland is a hub for aircraft securitisation), and the reclassification of technology and pharmaceutical corporate balance sheets following the closure of the Double Irish tax scheme in 2014, despite the fact that existing users of the Double Irish, which Noonan was referring to, had until 2020 to switch out of their Irish BEPS tool.

On 13 July 2016, the ex-Governor of the Central Bank of Ireland made the following comment:

The statistical distortions created by the impact on the Irish National Accounts of the global assets and activities of a handful of large multinational corporations have now become so large as to make a mockery of conventional uses of Irish GDP.

— Patrick Honohan, ex-Governor of the Central Bank of Ireland, 13 July 2016

The delay by the Central Statistics Office in publishing revisions to Q1 2015 data (the period in which the growth appeared), as well as the redaction of regular data from 2016 to 2017, meant that it would take almost three years for economists to show § Proof of Apple (2018) in Q1 2018. In addition, the Central Statistics Office further obfuscated the picture by asserting that the "leprechaun economics" growth was not attributable to a main source, but was from several sources and part of Ireland's position as a Modernised Global Economy.

While the Double Irish was a widely used Irish BEPS tool, Apple's Irish subsidiary, ASI, used a hybrid version approved by the Irish Revenue, which the EU Commission argued was state aid. In September 2016, the Central Statistics Office again denied this claim and repeated its assertion that the growth was from a range of sources including aircraft leasing.

By early 2017, research in the Sloan School of Management in the Massachusetts Institute of Technology, using the limited data released by the Irish Central Statistics Office, concluded: While corporate inversions and aircraft leasing firms were credited for increasing Irish [2015] GDP, the impact may have been exaggerated.

The use by Ireland of complex data protection and data privacy laws, such as contained in the 1993 Statistics Act, to protect Irish BEPS tools and Irish corporate tax avoidance schemes is documented by tax justice groups. The Irish Central Statistics Office was accused of "putting on the green jersey" to hide Apple's tax planning schemes, by some Irish political opposition groups. The Central Statistics Office (Ireland) did not list Modified GNI (discussed later) in their Key Summary Economic Indicitors for September 2018, but only GDP, GNP and Debt-to-GDP.

=== EU GDP levy ===
In July 2016, the Irish media reported that while the drivers of Ireland's "leprechaun economics" growth might not have produced tangible additional tax revenues for Ireland, the 26.3% rise in Ireland's GDP directly increased the due cost of Ireland's annual EU budget levy, which is calculated as a percentage of Eurostat GDP, by an estimated €380 million per annum.

In September 2016, the Irish government appealed to the EU Commission to amend the terms of the EU GDP levy to a GNI approach, so Ireland would not incur the full €380 million increase. There were unsubstantiated claims by the Irish government that the effective impact of the increase in the GDP levy would be reduced to circa €280 million per annum.

The "leprechaun economics" affair prompted an October 2016 audit by Eurostat into Ireland's economic statistics, including questions from the International Monetary Fund, however no irregularities were detected and it was accepted that the Irish Central Statistics Office had followed the Eurostat guidelines, as detailed in the Eurostat ESA 2010 Guidelines manual, in preparing the 2015 National Accounts.

On the 8 November 2016, a report by the EU Director-General for Internal Policies ("DG IPOL") on Ireland's "leprechaun economics" affair, noted that Detailed explanations are not provided, due to confidentiality rules aimed at protecting companies, and that the International Monetary Fund had stated that Additional metrics better reflecting the underlying developments of the Irish economy should be developed. The report concluded that: It is becoming increasingly difficult to represent the complexity of economic activity in Ireland in a single headline indicator such as GDP.

== Introduction of GNI* (2017) ==
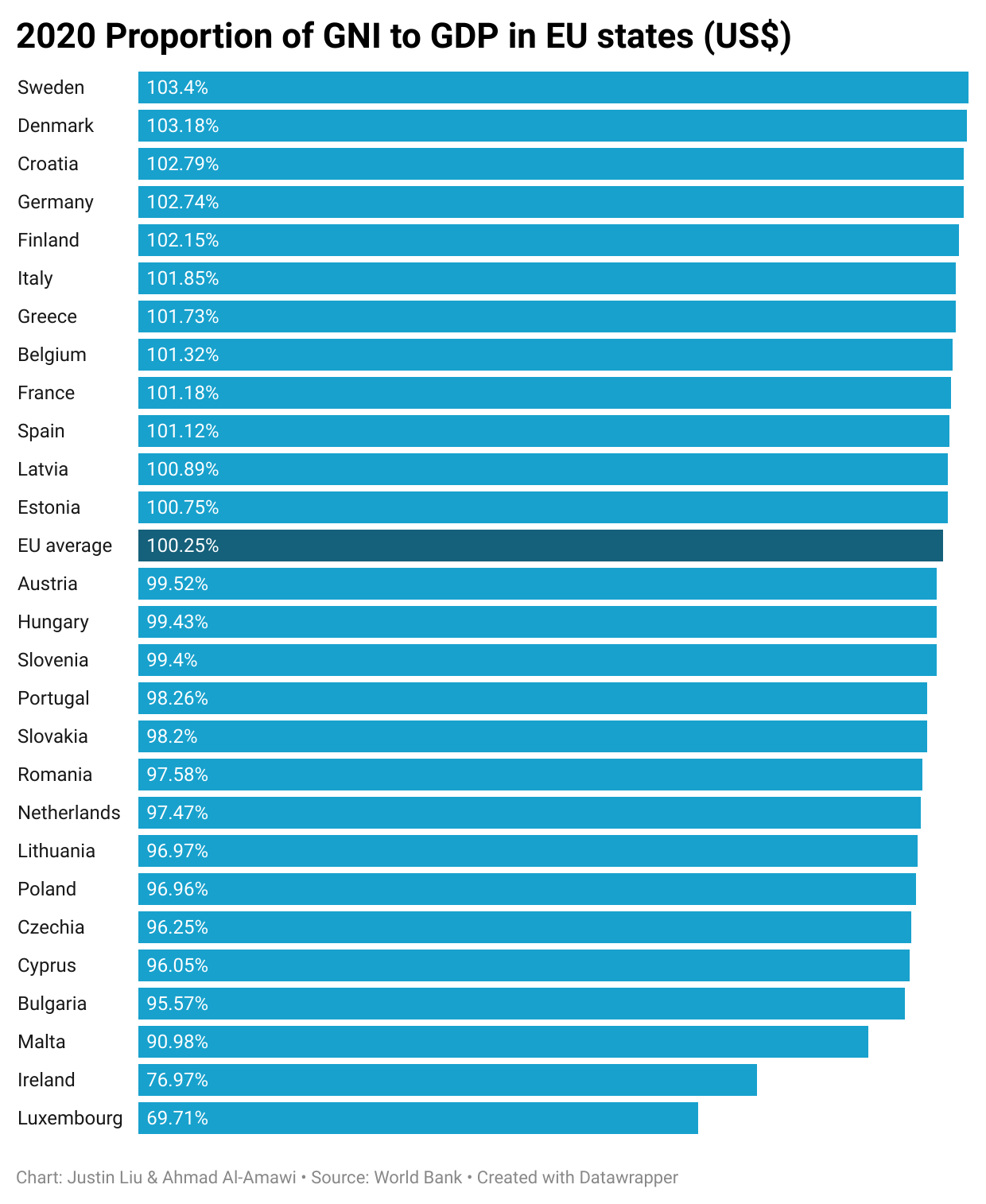
Ireland has one of the most disparate GNI to GDP ratios in the EU.

=== Pre-2015 distortions ===
From early academic research on tax havens by James R. Hines Jr. in 1994, Ireland has been noted as a tax haven (one of Hines' seven major havens). Hines would go on to become the most-cited author in the research of tax havens, recording Ireland's rise to become the 3rd largest global tax haven in the Hines 2010 list. As well as identifying and ranking tax havens, Hines, and others, including Dhammika Dharmapala, established that one of the main attributes of tax havens is the artificial distortion of the haven's GDP from the BEPS accounting flows. The highest GDP-per-capita countries, excluding oil and gas nations, are all tax havens.

In 2010, as part of Ireland's ECB bailout, Eurostat began tracking the distortion of Ireland's national accounts by BEPS flows. By 2011, Eurostat showed that Ireland's ratio of GNI to GDP, had fallen to 80% (i.e. Irish GDP was 125% of Irish GNI, or artificially inflated by 25%). Only Luxembourg, who ranked 1st on Hines' 2010 list of global tax havens, was lower at 73% (i.e. Luxembourg GDP was 137% of Luxembourg GNI). Eurostat's GNI/GDP table (see graphic) showed EU GDP is equal to EU GNI for almost every EU country, and for the aggregate EU–27 average. A 2015 Eurostat report showed that from 2010 to 2015, almost 23% of Ireland's GDP was now represented by untaxed multinational net royalty payments, thus implying that Irish GDP was now circa 130% of Irish GNI (e.g. artificially inflated by 30%).

=== Climax of 2015 ===
Apple's Q1 2015 BEPS transaction implied that Irish GDP was now well over 155% of Irish GNI, exceeding even Luxembourg, and making it inappropriate for ongoing monitoring of the high level of Irish indebtedness. In response, in February 2017, the Central Bank of Ireland became the first of the major tax havens to abandon GDP and GNP as metrics, and replaced them with a new measure: Modified gross national income, or GNI* (or GNI Star).

In July 2017, the Financial Times reporting on the new GNI* measure said: "The Irish economy is about a third smaller than expected. The country’s current account surplus is actually a deficit. And its debt level is at least a quarter higher than taxpayers have been led to believe"; and that "Embarrassed by what Paul Krugman, the economist, denounced as "leprechaun economics", Ireland's policymakers were determined to avoid a repeat".

At this point, multinational profit shifting doesn't just distort Ireland’s balance of payments; it constitutes Ireland’s balance of payments.

— Brad Setser and Cole Frank, Council on Foreign Relations, "Tax Avoidance and the Irish Balance of Payments", 25 April 2018

The move was timely; in 2018, research using 2015 data showed Ireland had become the world's largest tax haven (Zucman–Tørsløv–Wier 2018 list).

In April 2018, Eurostat welcomed GNI*, but showed it could not eliminate all BEPS effects (e.g. as the distortion in OECD Irish debt metrics showed).

== Proof of Apple (2018) ==
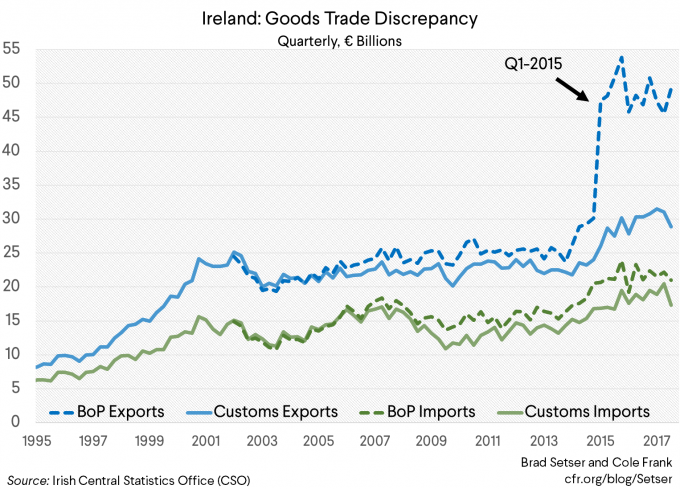
Ireland: Trade Good Discrepancy (1995–2017). Brad Setser & Cole Frank (Council on Foreign Relations)

=== 2018 filings ===
Economist Seamus Coffey is Chairman of the State's Irish Fiscal Advisory Council, and authored the State's 2017 Review of Ireland's Corporation Tax Code. Coffey had analysed Apple's Irish structure in detail, and was interviewed by the international media on Apple in Ireland. However, despite speculation, the suppression of regular economic data by the Irish Central Statistics Office meant that no economist could confirm the source of "leprechaun economics" was Apple.

On 24 January 2018, Coffey published a long analysis on his respected economics blog, confirming the data now proved Apple was the source:

We know Apple changed its structure from the first of January 2015. This is described in section 2.5.7 on page 42 of the EU Commission's decision [on Apple's State aid case]. This would be useful but bar telling us that the new structure came into operation on the first of January 2015 everything else is redacted. Although the details of the new structure were not revealed it was still felt that Ireland was still central to the structure and maybe even more so with the revised structure. Many of the dramatic shifts that occurred in Ireland's national accounts and balance of payments data were attributed to Apple but this was largely supposition – even if it was likely to be true. Now we know it to be true.

— Seamus Coffey, Economic Perspectives, University College Cork, 24 January 2018

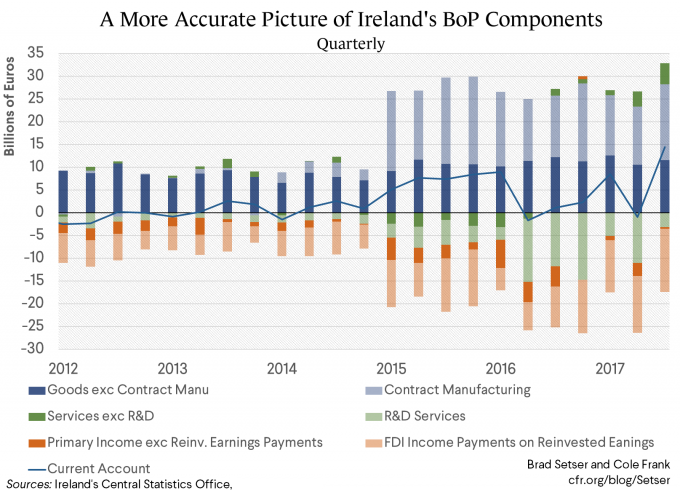
Ireland: Balance of Payments (2012–17). Brad Setser & Cole Frank (Council on Foreign Relations)

Coffey's January 2018 post also showed that Apple had restructured into the Irish Capital Allowances for Intangible Assets ("CAIA") BEPS tool. Apple's previous hybrid–Double Irish BEPS tool had a modest effect on Irish economic data as it was offshore. However, by onshoring their intellectual property ("IP") from Jersey, via the CAIA BEPS tool, the full effect of circa US$40 billion in profits that ASI was shifting by 2015 (see Table 1), would appear in the Irish national accounts; and was equivalent to over 20% of Irish GDP. The IMF began to correlate the effect of Apple iPhone sales on the Irish economic cycle.

Estimates of profits shifted through Apple's Irish subsidiary, Apple Sales International ("ASI") from 2004 to 2014
Year	ASI Profit Shifted (USD m)	Average €/$ rate	ASI Profit Shifted (EUR m)	Irish Corp. Tax Rate	Irish Corp. Tax Avoided (EUR m)
2004	268	.805	216	12.5%	27
2005	725	.804	583	12.5%	73
2006	1,180	.797	940	12.5%	117
2007	1,844	.731	1,347	12.5%	168
2008	3,127	.683	2,136	12.5%	267
2009	4,003	.719	2,878	12.5%	360
2010	12,095	.755	9,128	12.5%	1,141
2011	21,855	.719	15,709	12.5%	1,964
2012	35,877	.778	27,915	12.5%	3,489
2013	32,099	.753	24,176	12.5%	3,022
2014	34,229	.754	25,793	12.5%	3,224
Total	147,304		110,821		13,853

By April 2018, economists confirmed Coffey's analysis, and estimated Apple onshored USD 300 billion of IP from Jersey in Q1 2015 in the largest recorded BEPS action in history. In June 2018, the GUE-NGL EU Parliament group published an analysis of Apple's new Irish CAIA BEPS tool, they labeled the Green Jersey.

On 17 February 2020, Krugman tweeted, "So Tim Cook is the leprechaun in leprechaun economics".

=== Further concerns ===
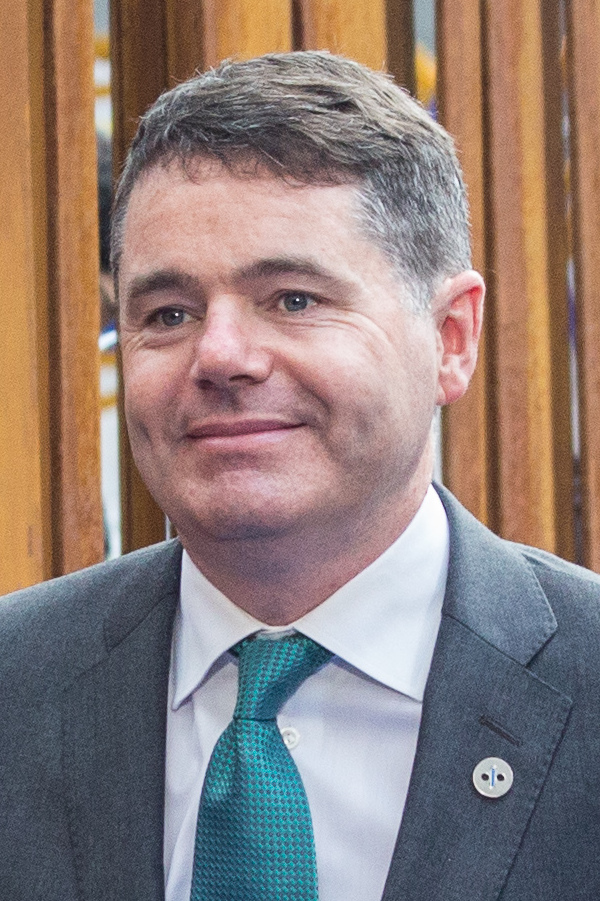
In 2017, Finance Minister Donohoe reversed the benefits Noonan gave Apple's 2015 CAIA BEPS scheme, but only applied it to new schemes.

The November 2017 Paradise Papers leaks, documented how in 2014, Apple and its lawyers, offshore magic circle firm Appleby, looked for a replacement for Apple's Irish hybrid–Double Irish BEPS tool. The leaks showed Apple considering a number of tax havens, especially Jersey and Ireland. Some of the documents demonstrated that tax avoidance was the driver of Apple's decision making.

Experts noted that it is prohibited under Ireland's tax code (Section 291A(c), Taxes and Consolation Act 1997), to use the CAIA BEPS tool for reasons that are not "commercial bona fide reasons", and in schemes where the main purpose is "... the avoidance of, or reduction in, liability to tax". (Note: This, if the Irish Revenue waived its anti-avoidance measures under Section 291A(c) to Apple's benefit, it could be construed as illegal EU State aid.)

In November 2017, the Irish media noted that the then Finance Minister Michael Noonan, had increased the tax relief threshold for the Irish CAIA BEPS scheme from 80 per cent to 100 per cent in the 2015 budget, which would reduce the effective Irish corporate tax rate on the CAIA BEPS tool from 2.5 per cent to 0 per cent. This was changed back in the subsequent 2017 budget by the new Finance Minister Paschal Donohoe, however firms which had started their Irish CAIA BEPS tool in 2015, like Apple, were allowed to stay at the 100 per cent relief level for the duration of their scheme, which can, under certain conditions, be extended indefinitely.

In November 2017, it was reported that the EU Commission had asked for details on Apple's new Irish structure post the EU Commission's 2004–2014 ruling.

In January 2018, when Seamus Coffey and others, estimated that since the Q1 2015 restructuring, Apple avoided Irish taxes of €2.5–3bn per annum, based on the 0% effective tax rate Noonan introduced for the CAIA scheme in the 2015 budget. Coffey estimated that a second EU Apple State aid fine for the 2015–2018 (inclusive) period, could reach over €10bn, excluding interest penalties, adding to Apple's existing €13 billion EU fine for the 2004–2014 period.

=== Impact on taxation ===
In July 2016, financial commentators were confused that Ireland had incurred €380 million per annum in additional EU GDP levies (earlier), but given Apple (in the 2015 budget, per above), an effective tax rate of 0% for the Apple IP that was onshored. Some pointed to the benefits of "leprechaun economics" to Ireland's credit rating, and Debt-to-GDP metrics. In August 2016, however, Apple CEO Tim Cook, stated that Apple was now "the largest tax payer in Ireland".

In April 2017, the Revenue Commissioners released Irish corporation tax data for 2015 showing a 49% increase, or €2.26 billion, to €6.87 billion in one year. The report also showed that "intangible allowances", which are claimed under the CAIA BEPS tool, jumped by over 1,000 per cent, or €26.2 billion in 2015 (from €2.7 billion in 2014), which was consistent with the euro amount of profits that Apple's ASI was shifting through its hybrid–Double Irish BEPS tool at the time. However, the €2.26 billion rise in corporate tax for 2015 looked similar to the effective tax ASI would pay in Ireland if it was not using Irish BEPS tools. No other company has been identified as the source of such a large jump in Irish corporation tax in a single year, as it required Irish booked profits of over US$30 billion.

Seamus Coffey posted several articles in 2018 on the rise in Irish "intangible allowances", which hit €35.7 billion in 2016, or €4.5 billion of Irish corporate tax avoided at the 12.5% rate. This is consistent with 2018 research showing that the "Green Jersey" is the largest BEPS tool in the world. However, in the absence of confirming data, Coffey is reluctant to draw a parallel between the dramatic 2015 rise in Irish corporation tax receipts, which has carried into 2016, and any potential change of tax strategy by Apple from the additional EU scrutiny into Apple's Q1 2015 restructure.

In May 2019, The Times reported that IMF experts, including Erik De Vrijer, Director of the IMF's European department, expressed concern about the lack of official understanding about the driver in the dramatic rise in Irish corporation tax receipts since 2014, and the implications for long-term State spending. Section 815A of the 1997 Tax Acts prevents disclosure of Irish taxation data, even to other officers of the Irish State, outside of the Irish Revenue Commissioners.

== Reverse leprechaun taxes (2019) ==
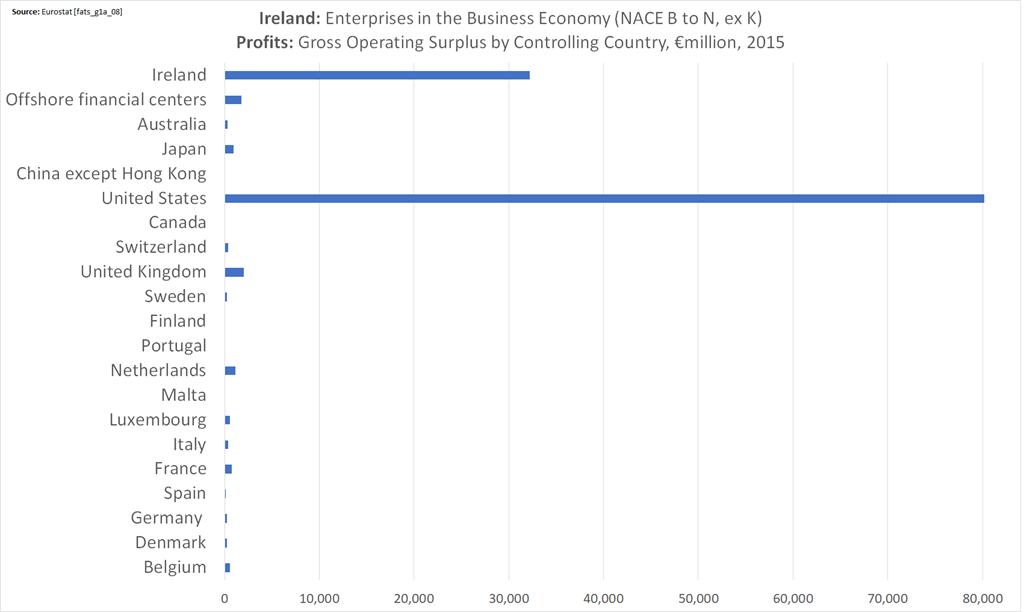
Dominance of U.S. companies: Irish corporate Gross Operating Surplus (i.e. profits), by the controlling country of the company (note: a material part of the Irish figure is also from U.S. tax inversions who are U.S.–controlled). Eurostat (2015).

In October 2018, Irish Finance Minister Paschal Donohoe introduced an IP exit-tax, which the Irish Independent described as being "to prevent a 'reverse leprechaun'". The new tax legislation classifies any gains realised in Ireland as a result of a multinational selling its Irish–based IP to another jurisdiction, as an Irish capital gain. While the Irish rate of capital gains tax was 33 per cent, the new legislation gave a lower rate of 12.5 per cent on IP capital gains; however this could be subject to change (or challenged by the EU Commission), and the rate brought into alignment with the general Irish 33 per cent capital gains tax rate.

In October 2017, Seamus Coffey questioned whether "reverse leprechaun" taxes would have any effect on U.S. multinationals leaving Ireland:

In 2015 there were a number of “balance-sheet relocations” with companies who had acquired IP while resident outside the country becoming Irish-resident. It is possible that companies holding IP for which capital allowances are currently being claimed could become non-resident and remove themselves from the charge to tax in Ireland. If they leave in this fashion there will be no transaction that triggers an exit tax liability.

— Seamus Coffey, "Intangibles, taxation and Ireland's contribution to the EU Budget", October 2017

== Legacy ==
=== Distortion of Irish statistics ===
Since leprechaun economics, research groups and commentators have highlighted that many Irish statistics are materially distorted by "leprechaun economics" type effects:

- In October 2017, the U.K. health-care journal The Lancet reported that leprechaun economics was distorting the understanding of comparative Irish health spending.
- In March 2018, the OECD showed that metrics of Irish public indebtedness were materially distorted by leprechaun economics.
- In February 2019, The Irish Times highlighted that Ireland's world-leading employee productivity statistics, were likely as a result of leprechaun economics effects. In July 2019, the Irish Times drew further parallels with "Leprechaun Economics" and OECD statistics that "... suggested Irish workers were the most productive on the planet, ..."
- In September 2019, the IMF, estimated that two thirds of Ireland's Financial Direct Investment (FDI) was "phantom", and referred to the underlying complications of leprechaun economics as, "Prominent cases include Irish GDP growth of 26 percent in 2015, following some multinationals’ relocation of intellectual property rights to Ireland".

=== Distortion of EU-28 GDP statistics ===
By April 2018, economists noted EU-28 aggregate GDP was being distorted by Irish BEPS tools, and the Apple iPhone sales cycle. By January 2020, economists had begun to realise that the Netherlands, as well as Ireland was also distorting EU-28 statistics, with the US Council of Foreign Relations, in a note titled: "Leprechaun Adjusted Euro Area GDP", said: "The entire euro area's economic statistics now need to be adjusted to remove the distortions created by the tax transactions of large multinationals operating in Ireland and the Netherlands".

=== Anti-Irish taxation measures ===
In September 2016, Ireland became the first of the major tax havens, to be "blacklisted" by a G20 economy, Brazil.

In December 2017, the U.S. and EU introduced new anti-Irish BEPS tool tax regimes (e.g. the U.S. GILTI–BEAT–FDII regimes, and the EU Digital Service Tax).

=== Further use of the CAIA tool ===
In July 2018, it was reported that Microsoft was preparing to execute a "Green Jersey" BEPS transaction. which, due to technical issues with the TCJA, makes the CAIA BEPS tool attractive to U.S. multinationals. In July 2018, Coffey posted that Ireland could see a "boom" in the onshoring of U.S. IP between now and 2020. In May 2019, it was reported Microsoft moved $52.8bn of IP assets to Ireland. In January 2020, the Irish Times speculated that Google Inc., was also considering using the CAIA BEPS tool, and noting that the CAIA had helped "trigger the Leprechaun Economics affair".

== See also ==
- CAIA arrangement
- Corporation tax in the Republic of Ireland
- Criticism of Apple Inc.
- Economy of the Republic of Ireland
- EU illegal State aid case against Apple in Ireland
- Single malt arrangement
