= Joel Slemrod =

American economist and academic (born 1951)

- Born: July 14, 1951 (age 75); Newark, New Jersey, U.S.

Academic background
- Education: Princeton University (AB); Harvard University (MA, PhD)
- Doctoral advisor: Martin Feldstein

Academic work
- Discipline: Public economics
- Institutions: University of Michigan
- Doctoral students: Lillian Mills, Wojciech Kopczuk
- Notable ideas: Tax havens; Corporate tax
- Awards: Daniel M. Holland Medal, National Tax Association (2012)
- Website: Joel Slemrod; Information at IDEAS / RePEc

Joel Brian Slemrod (born July 14, 1951) is an American economist and academic, currently serving as a professor of economics at the University of Michigan and the Paul W. McCracken Collegiate Professor of Business Economics and Public Policy at the Stephen M. Ross School of Business at the University of Michigan.

== Education ==
He earned a Bachelor of Arts degree from Princeton University in 1973 and a Ph.D. in economics from Harvard University in 1980.

== Career ==
Slemrod has served on the faculty of the University of Michigan since 1987, and does research on taxation, with a focus on taxation of personal income. He is co-author of Taxing Ourselves: A Citizen's Guide to the Great Debate over Tax Reform and the editor of Does Atlas Shrug? The Economic Consequences of Taxing the Rich. Slemrod also serves as Director of the Office of Tax Policy Research, which is a research center at the University of Michigan on matters of tax policy.

In 2001, Slemrod shared an Ig Nobel Prize with Wojciech Kopczuk, of Columbia University, for a paper concluding that people find a way to postpone their deaths if that would qualify them for a lower rate on the inheritance tax.

In 2012, Slemrod was awarded the Daniel M. Holland Medal by the National Tax Association.

Slemrod has authored op-ed articles for The New York Times and The Hill. He has also been featured on CNBC and Fox Business.

== See also ==
- James R. Hines Jr.
- Dhammika Dharmapala
- Double Irish, Single Malt, and CAIA, BEPS tools
- List of Ig Nobel Prize winners
