= Mihir A. Desai =

American tax economist

Mihir Arvind Desai
- Born: India

Academic background
- Education: Brown University; Harvard University

Academic work
- Discipline: Public economics
- Institutions: Harvard University
- Notable ideas: Corporate tax; International Finance
- Website: Mihir A. Desai

Mihir A. Desai is an Indian-American economist currently the Mizuho Financial Group Professor of Finance at Harvard Business School and Professor at Harvard Law School. He graduated from Brown University with a bachelor's degree of history and economics in 1989, earned an MBA (Baker Scholar) from Harvard Business School in 1993 and a PhD in Political Economy from Harvard University in 1998.

Desai has testified to Joint Committees in Washington on international corporate taxation, as is quoted in the main financial papers on US corporate tax.

== See also ==
- James R. Hines Jr.
- Dhammika Dharmapala
- Double Irish, Single Malt, and CAIA, BEPS tools
