= Brad W. Setser =

American economist

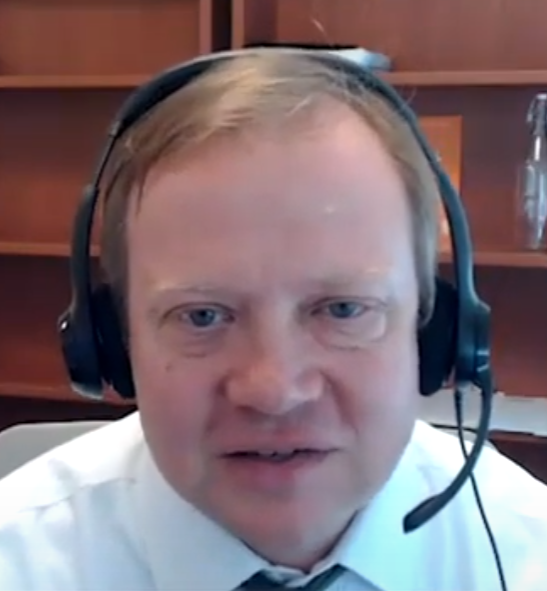
- In a Lowy Institute online discussion in 2023

Academic background
- Education: Harvard University (BA); Sciences Po Paris (MA); Oxford University (MA, PhD)

Academic work
- Discipline: Public economics
- Institutions: Council on Foreign Relations
- Website: Brad W. Setser Brad W. Setser on X

Brad W. Setser is an American economist. He is a former Counselor to the U.S. Trade Representative, Deputy Assistant Secretary of the U.S. Treasury, and Director of International Economics for the U.S. National Economic Council and National Security Council.

He currently serves as senior fellow for international economics at the Council on Foreign Relations. He was previously the Director of Global Research at Roubini Global Economics Monitor where he co-authored the book Bailouts or Bail-ins? with Nouriel Roubini.

== Career ==
Setser began his career as an international economist in the U.S. Treasury. He was subsequently a visiting scholar at the International Monetary Fund, before joining Roubini Global Economics.

After leaving the RGE in 2007, Setser became a fellow for international economics at the Council on Foreign Relations. In 2009, he took a position with the National Economic Council, as Director of International Economics. In 2011, he moved to the United States Department of the Treasury, where he was the Deputy Assistant Secretary for International Economic Analysis where he worked on Europe's financial crisis, U.S. currency policy, financial sanctions, commodity shocks, and Puerto Rico’s debt crisis.

In 2015, he returned as the Steven A. Tananbaum senior fellow for international economics at the Council on Foreign Relations. He is the author of the economics blog Follow the Money about global economic imbalances, which The Washington Post described in 2016 as a "must-read for those in the economics blogosphere".

Setser has been interviewed in financial publications such as The Wall Street Journal and the Financial Times on U.S. international economic issues. Setser has also written opinion pieces including in The New York Times and The Wall Street Journal on U.S. international economic policy.

In November 2020, Setser was named a member of the Joe Biden presidential transition Agency Review Team to support transition efforts related to the Office of the United States Trade Representative.

== Education ==
Setser holds a BA from Harvard University, an MA from Sciences-Po Paris, and an MA and PhD from the University of Oxford.

== Bibliography ==
- Roubini, Nouriel; Setser, Brad (2004). Bailouts or Bail-ins?: Responding to Financial Crises in Emerging Economies. Pearson. ISBN 978-0881323719.
- Rosenberg, Christoph; Setser, Brad (2005). Debt-Related Vulnerabilities and Financial Crises. International Monetary Fund (IMF). ISBN 978-1589064256.
- Setser, Brad (2008). U.S. External Debt and Power (Council Special Report). Council on Foreign Relations. ISBN 978-0876094150.

== See also ==
- Base erosion and profit shifting
- Leprechaun economics
- Ireland as a tax haven
- EU illegal State aid case against Apple in Ireland
- Double Irish, Single Malt, and CAIA
