= Dhammika Dharmapala =

American tax economist

- Born: Anurudha Udeni Dhammika Dharmapala; 1969 or 1970 (age 55–56); Sri Lanka

Academic background
- Education: University of Western Australia (BEc, MEc); University of California, Berkeley (PhD)
- Doctoral advisor: Alan J. Auerbach

Academic work
- Discipline: Public economics
- Institutions: UC Berkeley School of Law, University of Chicago Law School, University of Illinois
- Notable ideas: Corporate tax; Tax havens; Corporate tax havens; Base erosion and profit shifting
- Website: Faculty website; Information at IDEAS / RePEc

Dhammika Dharmapala (born 1969/1970) is an economist who is a professor of law at the University of California, Berkeley. He is known for his research into corporate tax avoidance, corporate use of tax havens, and the corporate use of base erosion and profit shifting ("BEPS") techniques.

== Biography ==
Dharmapala was born in Sri Lanka, educated in Australia, and settled in the U.S. (he is a naturalized U.S. citizen), to pursue a career as an academic economist. He taught economics at the University of Connecticut and law at the University of Illinois, Urbana-Champaign before joining the Chicago faculty in 2014. There he was the Paul H. and Theo Leffman Professor of Law at the University of Chicago Law School.

Dharmapala's research on tax havens, often with James R. Hines Jr., is cited as important. In addition to his role as professor at the University of Chicago Law School, Dharmapala is an International Research Fellow at the Oxford University Centre for Business Taxation, and has served on the board of directors of the American Law and Economics Association and the National Tax Association. Dharmapala is sometimes interviewed in the main U.S. financial media on U.S. corporate tax issues.

== Dharmapala tax havens ==
=== Dharmapala-Hines 2009 list ===
Because it is cited as one of the important papers on the research of tax havens, the 48 jurisdictions from the Dharmapala-Hines 2009 paper are listed below, per the markings in the paper (♣ & †):

6 of the 7 tax havens that Dharmapala-Hines identified in 2009, but which have never appeared in any OECD list (e.g. marked as †), namely, Ireland, Luxembourg, the Netherlands, Hong Kong, Singapore and Switzerland, would become ranked in the world's top ten global tax havens, when academics used quantitative methods to analyse tax havens (i.e. the "OECD havens", plus Singapore and Hong Kong).

1. Andorra
2. Anguilla
3. Antigua and Barbuda
4. Aruba♣
5. Bahamas
6. Bahrain
7. Barbados
8. Belize
9. Bermuda
10. British Virgin Islands
11. Cayman Islands
12. Channel Islands
13. Cook Islands
14. Cyprus
15. Dominica
16. Gibraltar
17. Grenada
18. Hong Kong†
19. Ireland†
20. Isle of Man
21. Jordan♣
22. Lebanon♣
23. Liberia
24. Liechtenstein
25. Luxembourg†
26. Macao†
27. Maldives
28. Malta
29. Marshall Islands
30. Mauritius♣
31. Monaco
32. Montserrat
33. Nauru♣
34. Netherlands†
35. Niue♣
36. Panama
37. Saint Kitts and Nevis
38. Saint Lucia
39. Saint Vincent and the Grenadines
40. Samoa♣
41. San Marino♣
42. Seychelles♣
43. Singapore†
44. Switzerland†
45. Tonga♣
46. Turks and Caicos Islands
47. Vanuatu
48. Virgin Islands (U.S.)♣

(†) Tax havens that were in the 41 from the Hines-Rice 1994 list, but not in the 35 from the OECD 2000 list (the largest), which include the four "OECD tax havens".
(♣) Tax havens that were in the 35 from the OECD 2000 list (the largest), but not in the 41 from the Hines-Rice 1994 list.

== Bibliography ==
- Dharmapala, Dhammika (2017). The Economics of Tax Avoidance and Evasion. Edward Elgar. ISBN 978-1785367441.

== See also ==
- Mihir A. Desai
- James R. Hines Jr.
- Gabriel Zucman
- Base erosion and profit shifting
- Tax haven
- Double Irish, Single Malt, and CAIA, BEPS tools
