= James R. Hines Jr. =

American tax economist

- Born: July 9, 1958 (age 68); Chicago, Illinois, U.S.

Academic background
- Education: Yale University (BSc, MSc); Harvard University (PhD)
- Doctoral advisor: Lawrence Summers

Academic work
- Discipline: Public economics
- Institutions: University of Michigan; Harvard University
- Notable ideas: Corporate tax; Tax havens; Corporate tax havens; Base erosion and profit shifting
- Awards: Daniel M. Holland Medal (2017)
- Website: James R. Hines Jr.; Information at IDEAS / RePEc

James R. Hines Jr. (born July 9, 1958) is an American economist and a founder of academic research into corporate-focused tax havens, and the effect of U.S. corporate tax policy on the behaviors of U.S. multinationals. He currently serves as the Richard A. Musgrave Collegiate Professor of Economics and the L. Hart Wright Collegiate Professor of Law at the University of Michigan.

Hines is the most cited author on the research of tax havens, and his work on tax havens was relied upon by the CEA when drafting the Tax Cuts and Jobs Act of 2017. His papers were some of the first to analyse profit shifting, and to establish quantitative features of tax havens. Hines showed that being a tax haven could be a prosperous strategy for a jurisdiction, and controversially, that tax havens can promote economic growth. Hines showed that use of tax havens by U.S. multinationals had maximized long-term U.S. exchequer tax receipts, at the expense of other jurisdictions.

== Career ==
James Hines was born in Chicago in 1958. He attended Yale University for his B.Sc. and M.Sc. in 1980. He completed his PhD in Harvard University in 1986. After various teaching and research posts in Princeton University and Harvard University, in 1997 he became Professor of Economics at the University of Michigan. Hines is a research associate of the National Bureau of Economic Research, and a research director of the International Tax Policy Forum.

Hines has testified to Congress on public tax policy on a number of occasions, and is quoted on related issues by the financial media, such as the Tax Cuts and Jobs Act of 2017 ("TCJA").

== Tax haven research ==
=== Hines-Rice paper ===
In February 1994, Hines and his Harvard PhD student, Eric M. Rice, published their 1990 National Bureau of Economic Research ("NBER") working paper (No. 3477), in the Quarterly Journal of Economics, on the use of tax havens by U.S. multinationals, which contained a number of important findings.

1. Base erosion and profit shifting ("BEPS"). Hines-Rice showed U.S. multinationals were using non-traditional tax havens, like Ireland and Singapore, that had large networks of tax treaties (which traditional tax havens are restricted from having), enabling them to avoid corporate taxes in all jurisdictions that had tax treaties with the haven, by a technique they called profit shifting;
2. Corporate tax havens. Hines-Rice noted that several of the most favoured locations for U.S. multinationals, such as Ireland, had normal headline corporate tax rates, but their tax regimes enabled accounting techniques to produce much lower effective corporate tax rates (e.g. Ireland was the lowest at 4%); these were the little-understood BEPS tools of the emerging corporate tax havens;
3. Definition of a tax haven. Hines-Rice felt the variations between havens was too material for a single definition, beyond a requirement for low effective tax rates; distortions from profit shifting led them to note proxies, including: the GDP-per-capita proxy, and the corporate profitabity proxy; in June 2018, these tools were used to show that Ireland was the largest tax haven;
4. U.S. as a beneficiary from tax havens. An unexpected conclusion from Hines-Rice was that: low foreign tax rates [from tax havens] ultimately enhance U.S. tax collections; by paying little/no foreign taxes, U.S. multinationals had avoided building up foreign tax credits; the 15.5% Tax Cuts and Jobs Act of 2017 levy would prove this finding again in 2017.

The 1994 Hines-Rice paper is recognised as the first important paper into BEPS and tax havens, and it is the most cited research paper in history on tax havens. The 1994 Hines-Rice paper has been cited by all subsequent most cited research papers into tax havens, including by Desai, Dharmapala, Slemrod, and Zucman.

The two most recent U.S. congressional investigations into tax havens: the 2008 investigation by the Government Accountability Office, and the 2015 investigation by the Congressional Research Service, identify the 1994 Hines-Rice paper as the first credible list of global tax havens, and the first quantitative analysis of what constitutes a tax haven.

=== Subsequent research ===
His subsequent 2007–2011 papers on tax havens showed that major tax havens, including Ireland, Singapore, Bermuda, Luxembourg, Hong Kong, were well governed and prosperous economies, from being tax havens: Tax havens are successful players in the world economy. He also asserted that tax havens could stimulate economic activity in nearby high-tax countries, by addressing issues in their tax systems, however this conclusion has been controversial and has drawn criticism from advocates of tax justice as being supportive of corporate tax avoidance by multinationals.

While Hines always avoided constructing overly specific or quantitative definitions of a tax haven, because of the variability in the types of economies that he had identified as tax havens, Hines does use a general definition that he employed during research with fellow tax-haven expert, Dhammaka Dharmapala, in 2009:

Tax havens are typically small, well-governed states that impose low or zero tax rates on foreign investors.

— "Multinational Firms and Tax Havens", The Review of Economics and Statistics (2016)

In November 2017, Hines was awarded the Daniel M. Holland Medal by the National Tax Association for his work, the second youngest winner in the medal's history.

In December 2017, his papers were cited by Harvard Professor Mihir A. Desai as ones that: changed the field and provided the roadmap for much of the next thirty years.

== Multinational tax research ==
As well as his work on BEPS and on tax havens, Hines is known for research into how U.S. corporate taxation, and the marginal rate of U.S. corporation tax, drives the behaviours of U.S. multinationals. Hines has been a strong advocate of moving the U.S. to a "territorial" tax model. In 2016, Hines, working with German academics, showed that German multinationals make little use of tax havens because the German corporate taxation system follows a "territorial" model. Hines cites the example of Ireland, a country featured on all of Hines' tax haven lists, which has rarely attracted firms from "territorial" taxation systems.

His research in this area was cited, although sometimes controversially so, by the Council of Economic Advisors ("CEA") in drafting the TCJA legislation in 2017; and advocating for reducing U.S. corporate taxes and moving to a hybrid "territorial" tax system framework, in order to drive U.S. employment and wage growth.

== Hines tax havens ==
=== Hines-Rice 1994 list ===
Because it is cited as the first coherent academic list of tax havens, the 41 jurisdictions from Appendix 2 in Hines-Rice (1994) are listed below, in the three sub-categories Hines-Rice used. The 7 major tax havens identified by Hines-Rice, who represent over 89% of tax haven GDP, are marked with a dagger (†).

Hines-Rice note that the U.S. IRS had identified 29 of their list as potential tax havens in 1987:

- Antigua & Barbuda
- Bahamas
- Bahrain
- Barbados
- Belize
- Bermuda
- British Virgin Islands
- Cayman Islands
- The Channel Islands
- Cook Islands
- Cyprus
- Gibraltar
- Grenada
- Hong Kong†
- Ireland†
- Isle of Man
- Liberia†
- Liechtenstein
- Luxembourg
- Montserrat
- Netherlands Antilles
- Panama†
- St. Kitts
- St. Vincent
- Singapore†
- Switzerland†
- Turks & Caicos
- U. K. Caribbean Islands
- Vanuatu

Hines-Rice note that Beauchamp had identified 7 of their list as potential tax havens in 1983:

- Anguilla
- Andorra
- Jordan
- Lebanon†
- Macao
- Monaco
- St. Martin

Hines-Rice note that Doggart had identified 5 of their list as potential tax havens in 1983:

- Dominica
- Maldives
- Malta
- Marshall Islands
- St. Lucia

=== Hines 2010 list ===
In a 2010 research paper, Hines produced a revised list of 52 tax havens, and also a method of quantifying and ranking the largest of them (Hines did not rank the whole list). Only two of the ten largest havens in Hines' 2010 list appeared in the OECD's 2000 list of tax havens (by 2017, the OECD list only contained Trinidad & Tobago). A major quantitative study in July 2017 study by the University of Amsterdam's CORPNET group, produced a list of havens that matched nine of the ten largest havens in Hines' list, but split into two types of haven: Conduit and Sinks. Another major quantitative study in June 2018 by Gabriel Zucman (et alia), produced a list whose ten largest havens also matched nine of Hines' top ten havens from 2010. Zucman calculated that Ireland had now become the largest of the ten major havens (Ireland's largest firms, Apple, Google and Facebook were smaller in 2010).

Ten largest havens, as specifically estimated by Hines, from the Hines 2010 list of 52 tax havens:

1. Luxembourg*‡
2. Cayman Islands*‡
3. Ireland*†
4. Switzerland*†
5. Bermuda*‡
6. Hong Kong*‡
7. Jersey‡Δ
8. Netherlands*†
9. Singapore*†
10. British Virgin Islands*‡Δ

(*) Identified as one of the largest 10 corporate tax havens on the Zucman-Tørsløv-Wier 2018 list in 2018 (Cayman and the British Virgin Islands appear as Caribbean).
(†) Identified as one of the 5 Conduits (Ireland, Singapore, Switzerland, the Netherlands, and the United Kingdom), by CORPNET in 2017.
(‡) Identified as one of the largest 5 Sinks (British Virgin Islands, Luxemburg, Hong Kong, Jersey, Bermuda), by CORPNET in 2017.
(Δ) Identified on the first, and the largest, OECD 2000 list of 35 tax havens (the OECD list only contained Trinidad & Tobago by 2017).

The full list of 52 tax havens from the Hines 2010 list, are shown below (Hines did not rank the full list, only the largest):

1. AndorraΔ
2. Anguilla‡Δ
3. Antigua and BarbudaΔ
4. ArubaΔ
5. Bahamas‡Δ
6. Bahrain↕Δ
7. Barbados↕Δ
8. Belize‡Δ
9. Bermuda‡
10. British Virgin Islands‡Δ
11. Cayman Islands‡
12. Cook IslandsΔ
13. Costa Rica
14. Cyprus‡
15. Djibouti
16. DominicaΔ
17. Gibraltar‡Δ
18. Grenada↕Δ
19. GuernseyΔ
20. Hong Kong‡
21. Ireland†
22. Isle of ManΔ
23. Jersey‡Δ
24. Jordan
25. Lebanon
26. Liberia‡Δ
27. Liechtenstein‡Δ
28. Luxembourg‡
29. Macao↕
30. MaldivesΔ
31. Malta‡
32. Marshall Islands‡↕Δ
33. Mauritius‡
34. Micronesia
35. Monaco‡Δ
36. MontserratΔ
37. Nauru‡Δ
38. Netherlands† & AntillesΔ
39. NiueΔ
40. Panama↕Δ
41. Samoa‡↕Δ
42. San Marino
43. Seychelles‡Δ
44. Singapore†
45. St. Kitts and NevisΔ
46. St. Lucia↕Δ
47. St. Martin
48. St. Vincent and the Grendines‡Δ
49. Switzerland†
50. TongaΔ
51. Turks and CaicosΔ
52. VanuatuΔ

(†) Identified as one of the 5 Conduits by CORPNET in 2017; the above list has 4 of the 5.
(‡) Identified as one of the largest 24 Sinks by CORPNET in 2017; the above list has 21 of the 24.
(↕) Identified on the European Union's first 2017 list of 17 tax havens; the above list contains 8 of the 17.
(Δ) Identified on the first, and the largest, OECD 2000 list of 35 tax havens (the OECD list only contained Trinidad & Tobago by 2017); the above list contains 34 of the 35.

== Bibliography ==
- Hines Jr., James R.; Feldstein, Martin (1995). The Effects of Taxation on Multinational Corporations. University of Chicago Press. ISBN 978-0226240954.
- Hines Jr., James R. (2001). International Taxation and Multinational Activity. University of Chicago Press. ISBN 978-0226341736.
- Hines Jr., James R. (2007). International Taxation. Edward Elgar. ISBN 978-1843764465.
- Hines Jr., James R. (2012). Taxing Corporate Income in the 21st Century. Cambridge University Press. ISBN 978-1107411517.

== See also ==
- Dhammika Dharmapala
- Conduit and Sink OFCs
- Gabriel Zucman
- Ireland as a tax haven
- United States as a tax haven
- Double Irish, Single Malt, and CAIA, BEPS tools
- Joel Slemrod

== Sources ==
=== Academic research ===
The following are the most cited papers on tax havens as ranked on the IDEAS/RePEc economic papers database, of the Federal Reserve Bank of St. Louis, over the last 25 years.

As well as being the most cited individual author on tax havens, Hines has authored or co-authored five of the ten most referenced papers on tax havens.

Papers on tax havens, ranked by academic citations, over the last 25 years.
| Rank | Paper | Journal | Vol-Issue-Page | Author | Year |
|---|---|---|---|---|---|
| 1 | Fiscal Paradise: Foreign tax havens and American Business | Quarterly Journal of Economics | 109 (1) 149–182 | James Hines, Eric Rice | 1994 |
| 2 | The demand for tax haven operations | Journal of Public Economics | 90 (3) 513–531 | Mihir A. Desai, C F Foley, James Hines | 2006 |
| 3 | Which countries become tax havens? | Journal of Public Economics | 93 (9–10) 1058–1068 | Dhammika Dharmapala, James Hines | 2009 |
| 4 | The Missing Wealth of Nations: Are Europe and the U.S. net Debtors or net Creditors? | Quarterly Journal of Economics | 128 (3) 1321–1364 | Gabriel Zucman | 2013 |
| 5 | Tax competition with parasitic tax havens | Journal of Public Economics | 93 (11–12) 1261–1270 | Joel Slemrod, John D. Wilson | 2006 |
| 6 | What problems and opportunities are created by tax havens? | Oxford Review of Economic Policy | 24 (4) 661–679 | Dhammika Dharmapala, James Hines | 2008 |
| 7 | In praise of tax havens: International tax planning and foreign direct investment | European Economic Review | 54 (1) 82–95 | Qing Hong, Michael Smart | 2010 |
| 8 | End of bank secrecy: An Evaluation of the G20 tax haven crackdown | American Economic Journal | 6 (1) 65–91 | Niels Johannesen, Gabriel Zucman | 2014 |
| 9 | Taxing across borders: Tracking personal wealth and corporate profits | Journal of Economic Perspectives | 28 (4) 121–148 | Gabriel Zucman | 2014 |
| 10 | Treasure Islands | Journal of Economic Perspectives | 24 (4) 103–26 | James Hines | 2010 |
