= Corruption Perceptions Index =

Country ranking by public sector corruption

Map of the Corruption Perceptions Index, 2025, as scored by Transparency international. A higher score indicates greater transparency (i.e., less corruption). The score ranges are: Less corrupt 90–100 80–89 70–79 60–69 50–59 / More corrupt 40–49 30–39 20–29 10–19 0–9 No data

The Corruption Perceptions Index (CPI) is an index published annually by Transparency International, a German registered association, since 1995. It scores and ranks countries by their perceived levels of public sector corruption, as assessed by experts and business executives. The CPI generally defines corruption as an "abuse of entrusted power for private gain".

From 1995 to 2011, the index was scored on a scale of 10 to 0. Since 2012, the Corruption Perceptions Index has been ranked on a scale from 100 (very clean) to 0 (highly corrupt).

Of the 182 countries ranked in the 2025 CPI, published in February 2026, the top scorers included Denmark (89), Finland (88), and Singapore (84), while those perceived as the most corrupt included South Sudan (9), Somalia (9), and Venezuela (10).

Although widely used as a key indicator of corruption, the CPI does not capture all forms of corruption. It also does not distinguish among different kinds of corruption.Perceptions about corruption may differ from actual levels of corruption and the index focuses solely on the public sector. For a more comprehensive picture, the CPI should be used alongside other assessments.

== Methods ==
The CPI methodology, revised in 2012, enables consistent comparison of corruption perceptions across countries and years. It involves four stages: selecting data sources, rescaling them to a uniform 0–100 scale, aggregating the results, and estimating uncertainty.

=== Selection of source data ===
The goal of the data selection is to capture expert and business leader assessments of various public sector corruption practices. This includes bribery, misuse of public funds, abuse of public office for personal gain, nepotism in civil service, and state capture. Since 2012 CPI has taken into account 13 different surveys and assessments from 12 different institutions. The institutions are:

- African Development Bank (based in Ivory Coast)
- Bertelsmann Foundation (based in Germany)
- Economist Intelligence Unit (based in the UK)
- Freedom House (based in the US)
- Global Insight (based in the US)
- International Institute for Management Development (based in Switzerland)
- Political and Economic Risk Consultancy (based in Hong Kong)
- The PRS Group, Inc. (based in the US)
- World Bank
- World Economic Forum
- World Justice Project (based in the US)

Countries need to be evaluated by at least three sources to appear in the CPI. The CPI measures the perception of corruption due to the difficulty of measuring absolute levels of corruption. Transparency International commissioned the University of Passau's Johann Graf Lambsdorff to produce the CPI. Early CPIs used public opinion surveys.

=== Rescaling source data ===
In order for all data to be aggregated into the CPI, it is first necessary to carry out standardization during which all data points are converted to a scale of 0–100. Here, 0 represents the most corruption and 100 signifies the least. Indices originally measuring corruption inversely (higher values for higher corruption) are multiplied by -1 to align with the 0–100 scale.

In the next step, the mean and standard deviation for each data source based on data from the baseline year are calculated (the "impute" command of the STATA statistical software package is used to replace missing values). Subsequently, a standardized z score is calculated with an average centered around 0 and a standard deviation of 1 for each source from each country. Finally, these scores are converted back to a 0–100 scale with a mean of approximately 45 and a standard deviation of 20. Scores below 0 are set to 0, and scores exceeding 100 are capped at 100. This ensures consistent comparability across years since 2012.

=== Aggregating the rescaled data ===
The resulting CPI score for each country is calculated as a simple average of all its rescaled scores that are available for the given country, while at least three data sources must be available in order to calculate the index. The imputed data is used only for standardization and is not used as a score to calculate the index.

=== Reporting a measure for uncertainty ===
The CPI score is accompanied by a standard error and confidence interval. This reflects the variation present within the data sources used for a particular country or territory.

== Related phenomena and indices ==
=== CPI and economic growth ===
Research papers published in 2007 and 2008 examined the economic consequences of corruption perception, as defined by the CPI. The researchers found a correlation between a higher CPI and higher long-term economic growth, as well as an increase in GDP growth of 1.7% for every unit increase in a country's CPI score. Also shown was a power-law dependence linking higher CPI score to higher rates of foreign investment in a country.

The research article "The Investigation of the Relationship between Corruption Perception Index and GDP in the Case of the Balkans" from 2020 confirms the positive co-integration relationship in Balkan countries between CPI and GDP and calculates the affecting rate of CPI GDP as 0.34. Moreover, the direction of causality between CPI and GDP was identified from CPI to GDP and, according to this, the hypothesis that CPI is the cause of GDP was accepted.

The working paper Corruption and Economic Growth: New Empirical Evidence from 2019 emphasizes that many previous studies used the CPI for their analysis before 2012 (when the index was difficult to compare over time) and therefore may be biased. At the same time, it presents new empirical evidence based on data for 175 over the period 2012–2018. The results show that corruption is negatively associated with economic growth (Real per capita GDP decreased by around 17% in the long-run when the reversed CPI increased by one standard deviation).

=== CPI and justice ===
As reported by Transparency International, there is a correlation between the absence of discrimination and a better CPI score. That indicates that in countries with high corruption, equal treatment before the law is not guaranteed and there is more space for discrimination against specific groups.

It seems that the country's justice system is an important protector of the country against corruption, and conversely, a high level of corruption can undermine the effectiveness of the justice system. Furthermore, as noted by the United Nations Office on Drugs and Crime (UNODC), justice systems around the world are overburdened with large caseloads, chronically underfunded, and in need of more financial and human resources to properly fulfill their mandates. This, in combination with increasing outside interference, pressures and efforts to undermine judicial independence, results in the inability of justice systems to control corruption. The latest edition of the World Justice Project's Rule of Law Index, which shows that in the past year, justice systems in most countries exhibited signs of deterioration, including increasing delays and lower levels of accessibility and affordability, also serves as evidence of the urgency of the situation. Conversely, because corruption implies disproportionate favoring of some groups or individuals over others, it prevents people from accessing justice. For example, a person may rely on personal contacts to change a statutory process.

As shown in the Corruption Perception Index 2023, there is also a positive relationship between corruption and impunity. Countries with higher levels of corruption are less likely to sanction public officials for failing to adhere to existing rules and fulfill their responsibilities. A positive relationship was also shown between corruption and access to justice.

=== Other phenomena and indices ===
A Georgetown University master's thesis The Relationship Between Corruption And Income Inequality: A Crossnational Study, published in 2013, investigates the connection between corruption and income inequality on a global scale. The study's key finding is a robust positive association between income inequality (measured by the Gini coefficient) and corruption (measured by the CPI).

A study from 2001 shows that the more affected by corruption, the worse a country's environmental performance. Measuring national environmental performance according to 67 variables, the closest match is with the 2000 TI Corruption Perceptions Index, which revealed a 0.75 correlation with the ranking of environmental performance.

A 2022 study titled "Statistical Analyses on the Correlation of Corruption Perception Index and Some Other Indices in Nigeria" investigated the relationship between the Corruption Perception Index in Nigeria and other relevant indices. These other indices included the Human Development Index (HDI), Global Peace Index (GPI), and Global Hunger Index (GHI). The result from the analysis carried out on the standardized data set shows that a positive linear relationship exists among all the variable considered except for CPI and GPI holding HDI and GHI constant which indicates a negative linear relationship between them.

A study investigating the relationship between public governance and the Corruption Perception Index found that aspects of public administration like voice and accountability, political stability, and rule of law significantly influence how corrupt a country is perceived to be. This suggests that strong governance practices can be effective in reducing corruption.

== Criticism ==
The CPI has received significant criticism related to its conceptual and methodological limitations, and bias towards developed countries.

According to political scientist Dan Hough, three flaws in the index include:

- Corruption is too complex a concept to be captured by a single score. For instance, the nature of corruption in rural Kansas will be different from that in the city administration of New York, yet the index measures them in the same way.
- Measuring perception of corruption, rather than corruption itself, may reinforce existing stereotypes and cliches.
- The index only measures public sector corruption, ignoring the private sector. This, for instance, means the well-publicized Libor scandal, Odebrecht Case and the Volkswagen emissions scandal are not counted as corrupt actions.

While criticizing the Index for its limited usefulness in measuring corruption, Hough says it "helps to keep the fight against corruption on the agendas of policymakers and the global commentariat". He has added that the Index is "still generally regarded as a decent place to start" and says the Index results are not too dissimilar from other indexes of corruption and integrity, such as the Global Corruption Index, the Freedom from Corruption Index, the Index of Public Integrity and the World Bank's index of quality of governance.

Media outlets frequently use the raw numbers as a yardstick for government performance, without clarifying what the numbers mean. The local Transparency International chapter in Bangladesh disowned the index results after a change in methodology caused the country's scores to increase; media reported it as an "improvement".

In a 2013 Foreign Policy article, Alex Cobham argues that the CPI reflects an elite bias in popular perceptions of corruption, potentially contributing to a vicious cycle and incentivizing inappropriate policy responses. Cobham writes, "the index corrupts perceptions to the extent that it's hard to see a justification for its continuing publication." He noted that "many of the staff and chapters" at Transparency International, "protest internally" over concerns about the index. The original creator of the index, Johann Graf Lambsdorff, withdrew from work on the index in 2009, stating that he was "no longer available for doing the Corruption Perceptions Index."

Recent econometric analyses that have exploited the existence of natural experiments on the level of corruption and compared the CPI with other subjective indicators have found that, while not perfect, the CPI is argued to be broadly consistent with one-dimensional measures of corruption.

In the United States, many lawyers advise international businesses to consult the CPI when attempting to measure the risk of Foreign Corrupt Practices Act violations in different nations. This practice has been criticized by the Minnesota Journal of International Law, which wrote that since the CPI may be subject to perceptual biases it therefore should not be considered by lawyers to be a measure of actual national corruption risk.

Transparency International also publishes the Global Corruption Barometer, which ranks countries by corruption levels using direct surveys instead of perceived expert opinions, which has been under criticism for substantial bias from the powerful elite.

Transparency International has warned that a country with a clean CPI score may still be linked to corruption internationally. For example, while Sweden had the 3rd best CPI score in 2015, one of its state-owned companies, TeliaSonera, was facing allegations of bribery in Uzbekistan.

== Scoring ==
Corruption Perceptions Index. Click arrow, then use slider to change year. Go to source for more interactivity.

As stated by Transparency International in the 2023 Corruption Perceptions Index, the level of corruption was stagnating at the global level. Only 28 of the 180 countries measured by the CPI at that time had improved their corruption levels over the last twelve years, and 34 countries had significantly worsened. No significant change was recorded for 118 countries. Moreover, according to Transparency International, over 80 percent of the population lived in countries whose CPI score was lower than the global average of 43, and thus corruption remained a problem that affected the majority of people globally.

Among the states with the most significant score decline in the 2023 CPI were authoritarian states such as Venezuela, as well as established democracies that had been rated high for a long time, such as Sweden (decrease of 7, 2023 score 82) or Great Britain (decrease 3, 2023 score 71). Other countries experiencing sharp declines included Sri Lanka, Mongolia, Gabon, Guatemala, and Turkey. In contrast, the most significant improvements in the 2023 CPI score over the preceding twelve years were recorded by Uzbekistan, Tanzania, Ukraine, Ivory Coast, the Dominican Republic and Kuwait.

=== 2025 scores ===
Below are the scores for each country in the Corruption Perceptions Index for 2025. The scores reflect a country's transparency (i.e., the opposite of corruption).

Legend

Scores	Perceived as less corrupt					Perceived as more corrupt				
since 2012	100–90	89–80	79–70	69–60	59–50	49–40	39–30	29–20	19–10	9–0

Scores in the Corruption Perceptions Index for 2025.
#	Location	Score	Rank change
1	Denmark	89	–
2	Finland	88	–
3	Singapore	84	–
4	New Zealand	81	–
4	Norway	81	+1
6	Sweden	80	+2
6	Switzerland	80	-1
8	Luxembourg	78	-3
8	Netherlands	78	+1
10	Germany	77	+5
10	Iceland	77	–
12	Australia	76	-2
12	Estonia	76	+1
12	Hong Kong	76	+5
12	Ireland	76	-2
16	Canada	75	-1
17	Uruguay	73	-4
18	Bhutan	71	–
18	Japan	71	+2
20	United Kingdom	70	–
21	Austria	69	+4
21	Belgium	69	+1
21	United Arab Emirates	69	+2
24	Barbados	68	-1
24	Seychelles	68	-6
24	Taiwan	68	+1
27	France	66	-2
28	Lithuania	65	+4
29	Bahamas	64	-1
29	United States	64	-1
31	Brunei Darussalam	63	–
31	Chile	63	+1
31	Saint Vincent and the Grenadines	63	+1
31	South Korea	63	-1
35	Cape Verde	62	–
35	Israel	62	-5
37	Dominica	60	-1
37	Latvia	60	+1
39	Czech Republic	59	+7
39	Saint Lucia	59	-1
41	Botswana	58	+2
41	Qatar	58	-3
41	Rwanda	58	+2
41	Slovenia	58	-5
45	Saudi Arabia	57	-4
46	Costa Rica	56	-4
46	Grenada	56	–
46	Portugal	56	-3
49	Cyprus	55	-3
49	Fiji	55	+1
49	Spain	55	-3
52	Italy	53	–
53	Poland	52	+1
54	Malaysia	52	+3
54	Oman	52	-4
56	Bahrain	50	-6
56	Georgia	50	-3
56	Greece	50	+3
56	Jordan	50	+3
60	Malta	49	+5
61	Mauritius	48	-5
61	Slovakia	48	-2
63	Croatia	47	–
63	Vanuatu	47	-6
65	Armenia	46	-2
65	Kuwait	46	–
65	Montenegro	46	–
65	Namibia	46	-6
65	Senegal	46	+4
70	Benin	45	-1
70	Romania	45	-5
70	São Tomé and Príncipe	45	-1
73	Jamaica	44	–
73	Solomon Islands	44	+3
73	Timor-Leste	44	–
76	China	43	–
76	Ghana	43	+4
76	Ivory Coast	43	-7
76	Kosovo	43	-3
80	Moldova	42	-4
81	South Africa	41	+1
81	Trinidad and Tobago	41	+1
81	Vietnam	41	+7
84	Bulgaria	40	-8
84	Burkina Faso	40	-2
84	Cuba	40	-2
84	Guyana	40	+8
84	Hungary	40	-2
84	North Macedonia	40	+4
84	Tanzania	40	-2
91	Albania	39	-11
91	India	39	+5
91	Maldives	39	+5
91	Morocco	39	+8
91	Tunisia	39	+1
96	Ethiopia	38	+3
96	Kazakhstan	38	-8
96	Suriname	38	-8
99	Colombia	37	-7
99	Dominican Republic	37	+5
99	Gambia	37	-3
99	Lesotho	37	–
99	Zambia	37	-7
104	Argentina	36	-5
104	Belize	36	–
104	Ukraine	36	+1
107	Brazil	35	–
107	Sri Lanka	35	+14
109	Algeria	34	-2
109	Bosnia and Herzegovina	34	+5
109	Indonesia	34	-10
109	Laos	34	+5
109	Malawi	34	-2
109	Nepal	34	-2
109	Sierra Leone	34	+5
116	Ecuador	33	+5
116	Panama	33	-2
116	Serbia	33	-11
116	Thailand	33	-9
120	Angola	32	+1
120	El Salvador	32	+10
120	Philippines	32	-6
120	Togo	32	+1
124	Belarus	31	-10
124	Djibouti	31	+3
124	Mongolia	31	-10
124	Niger	31	-17
124	Turkey	31	-17
124	Uzbekistan	31	-3
130	Azerbaijan	30	+24
130	Egypt	30	–
130	Kenya	30	-9
130	Mauritania	30	–
130	Peru	30	-3
135	Gabon	29	–
136	Bolivia	28	-3
136	Iraq	28	+4
136	Liberia	28	-1
136	Mali	28	-1
136	Pakistan	28	-1
141	Mexico	27	-1
142	Cameroon	26	-2
142	Guatemala	26	+4
142	Guinea	26	-9
142	Kyrgyzstan	26	+4
142	Nigeria	26	-2
142	Papua New Guinea	26	-15
148	Madagascar	25	-8
148	Uganda	25	-8
150	Bangladesh	24	+1
150	Central African Republic	24	-1
150	Paraguay	24	-1
153	Congo	23	-2
153	Eswatini	23	-18
153	Iran	23	-2
153	Lebanon	23	+1
157	Chad	22	+1
157	Honduras	22	-3
157	Russia	22	-3
157	Zimbabwe	22	+1
161	Guinea-Bissau	21	-3
161	Mozambique	21	-15
163	Cambodia	20	-5
163	Comoros	20	-5
163	Democratic Republic of the Congo	20	–
166	Tajikistan	19	-2
167	Burundi	17	-2
167	Turkmenistan	17	-2
169	Afghanistan	16	-4
169	Haiti	16	-1
169	Myanmar	16	-1
172	Equatorial Guinea	15	+1
172	North Korea	15	-2
172	Syria	15	+5
175	Nicaragua	14	-3
175	Sudan	14	-5
177	Eritrea	13	-4
177	Libya	13	-4
177	Yemen	13	-4
180	Venezuela	10	-2
181	Somalia	9	-2
181	South Sudan	9	-1

== List by region ==
Corruption Perceptions Index scores.

Average CPI score for each region since 2012. Countries column has number of countries in 2025.
Region	Countries	2025	2024	2023	2022	2021	2020	2019	2018	2017	2016	2015	2014	2013	2012
Western Europe and European Union	31	64	64.29	65.35	65.52	65.87	65.81	66.06	66.32	66.35	66.39	67.39	66.10	65.19	65.10
Americas	33	42	42.19	42.69	42.97	43.13	43.38	43.38	43.72	44.19	44.09	40.31	44.94	44.32	45.03
Central Asia and Eastern Europe	19	34	34.84	35.32	35.21	35.68	35.95	34.79	34.53	34.47	34.32	33.21	33.11	32.74	32.79
Asia-Pacific	32	45	44.48	44.52	45.13	45.10	45.29	44.87	44.39	44.39	43.87	42.56	42.70	43.04	42.64
Sub-Saharan Africa	49	32	32.51	32.82	32.39	32.51	32.31	32.24	32.24	32.02	31.46	32.30	32.73	32.12	33.35
Middle East and North Africa	18	39	39.00	38.00	37.50	38.72	39.11	39.00	38.56	37.89	37.50	40.06	39.67	38.44	40.00
World	182	42.47	42.66	42.97	42.98	43.27	43.34	43.17	43.12	43.07	42.95	42.60	43.16	42.55	43.15

== Transnational corruption in states with high CPI scores ==
The advanced economies of Northern and Western Europe, North America, and Asia and the Pacific tend to top the rankings over the long term. This means that these countries are perceived as having a low level of corruption in the public sector. These nations also generally have well-functioning judicial systems, a strong rule of law, and political stability – all factors that contribute to perceptions of clean governance. However, while these top-ranked countries have strong domestic institutions, their commitment to fighting corruption appears to be weak when it comes to their own financial systems and regulations affecting the international environment. The CPI does not capture transnational corruption, so corrupt foreign business practices by companies from these countries don't affect their CPI scores. The example of the Netherlands highlights this issue. Despite a high CPI score, the Netherlands has a poor record of prosecuting companies that bribe foreign officials to win contracts, as seen in the Nigerian oil bribery case.

The report Exporting Corruption 2022, which assesses foreign bribery enforcement in 43 of the 44 signatories to the OECD Anti-Bribery Convention, as well as China, ZAO Hong Kong, India and Singapore, reinforces this concern. It found a significant decline in foreign bribery enforcement. Only two out of 47 countries are now in the active enforcement category. Other key findings were that no country is exempt from bribery by its nationals and related money laundering. Moreover, according to the report, weaknesses remain in legal frameworks and enforcement systems are not adequately disclosed by most countries information on enforcement, victim compensation is rare and international cooperation is increasing but still faces significant obstacles. This calls for a more comprehensive approach to tackling corruption, addressing both domestic and international aspects.

== See also ==
- Democracy indices
- Financial Secrecy Index
- Global Peace Index
- List of freedom indices
