= Bureau van Dijk =

Business information publisher based in Belgium

Bureau van Dijk – A Moody's Analytics Company
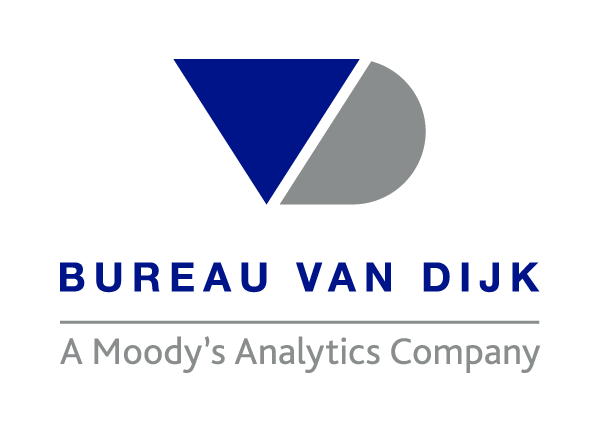
- Type: Subsidiary of Moody's
- Industry: Business intelligence
- Founded: 1991
- Founder: Bernard Van Ommeslaghe
- Headquarters: City of Brussels
- Number of locations: 30+
- Products: A range of products including Orbis, Fame, Mint, Compliance Catalyst, Credit Catalyst, Procurement Catalyst, TP Catalyst
- Number of employees: approx. 700
- Parent: Moody's
- Website: www.bvdinfo.com

Bureau van Dijk is a major publisher of business information, and specialises in private company data combined with software for searching and analysing companies. It is a Moody's Analytics company. Orbis is Bureau van Dijk's flagship company database.

On 15 May 2017 it was announced that Moody's entered into a definitive agreement to acquire Bureau van Dijk, which completed in August 2017.

== Overview ==
Bureau van Dijk's product range combines data from regulatory and other sources, including 160 information providers, with software to allow users to manipulate data for a range of research needs and applications. Unlike other providers of content, Bureau van Dijk reveals their sources and shows the source data – allowing users to create their own analytics and predictive analysis based on underlying primary data and reporting.

The majority of staff focus on sales, marketing and customer support in offices in: Amsterdam, Beijing, Bratislava, Brussels, Buenos Aires, Chicago, Copenhagen, Dubai, Frankfurt, Geneva, Hong Kong, Johannesburg, Lisbon, London, Madrid, Manchester, Mexico City, Milan, Moscow, New York, Paris, Rome, San Francisco, São Paulo, Seoul, Shanghai, Singapore, Stockholm, Sydney, Tokyo, Vienna, Washington D.C. and Zurich.

Bureau van Dijk's research team collects both global M&A data and intelligence around corporate ownership structures, and is based in Manchester, Brussels and Singapore. It also has a team of journalists writing news stories on deals and market rumours.

Product management and software development are based in the Geneva and Brussels offices. The company has over 5,000 clients including banks, insurance companies, financial and consulting organisations, governments and research institutes. Bureau van Dijk claims to offer the most powerful comparable resource of information on private companies in the world. The company brand statement is "The Business of Certainty". The company regularly blogs content and white papers, offering free resources on compliance and other risk areas.

=== History ===
Bureau van Dijk originated in the 1970s., when Belgian businessman Marcel van Dijk and partners established a company named "Bureau Marcel van Dijk" specialising in documentary and information systems. In 1972, it expanded to Paris and Brussels.

In 1985, on the retirement of Marcel van Dijk, Professor Bernard van Ommeslaghe and Alain Liedts took over the company and broadened its operations to management consulting, auditing and IT support. In 1987, Bureau van Dijk started a new service in Europe with the design and dissemination on CD-ROM of economic and financial databases having company information (the precursor to Bureau van Dijk's online databases).

In 1991, a second company, "Bureau van Dijk Electronic Publishing", was formed to update and expand these databases, while the consulting division remained within Bureau van Dijk Ingénieurs Conseils. The owners of Bureau van Dijk were also members of management and the board, and the company has since been sold.

Candover acquired a 60% stake in Bureau van Dijk in 2004 after founder and chairman Professor van Ommeslaghe, who was 70, decided to sell part. The other 40% was then thought to be owned by the management.

Bureau van Dijk was sold to Charterhouse Capital Partners in July 2011, backed by 505 million euros of leveraged loans, including 365 million euros of senior loans and 140 million euros of mezzanine debt maturing in 2019. In July 2014, EQT AB purchased Bureau van Dijk from Charterhouse backed by an 845 million-euro equivalent leveraged loan. In early 2015, Swedish pension fund Sjätte AP-fonden (AP6) bought a 3% stake in Bureau van Dijk, through a direct co-investment.

In May 2017, Moody's Analytics announced it would buy the company for 3 billion euros, which was completed in August 2017.

== Products ==
Bureau van Dijk offers a range of products/databases which focus on corporate finance and mergers and acquisitions (M&A), transfer pricing, compliance and third party due diligence, procurement and supplier risk, credit risk, academic research and business development. These products include:

=== Orbis ===
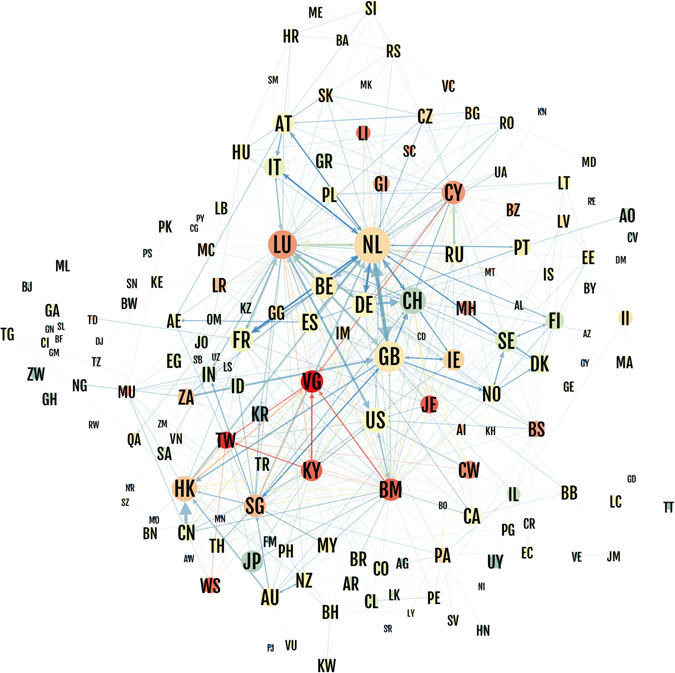
"Uncovering Offshore Financial Centers": CORPNET's map of connections between countries.

Orbis is Bureau van Dijk's flagship company database. It contains information on companies across the world and focuses on private company information and also presenting companies in comparable formats. It has information on around 400 million companies from all countries. Bureau van Dijk sources the information from over 170 different providers and states that it adds value to this information as it standardises the data and links the sources together. A study by the University of Amsterdam's CORPNET group published in 2017 in Nature used the Orbis database to analyse over 98 million global corporate connections to investigate tax havens and offshore financial centre (OFCs); resulting in new classifications of Conduit and Sink OFCs.

=== Amadeus (transitioning to Orbis Europe) ===
Analyse Major Databases from European Sources (Amadeus) is a pan-European database containing financial information on over 24 million public and private companies.

=== Moody's BankFocus ===
BankFocus is a global database containing information on over 40,000 public and private banks.

=== Osiris ===
Osiris is a database of listed companies, banks and insurance companies around the world.

=== Orbis InsuranceFocus ===
Orbis Insurance Focus is a comprehensive database of detailed reports on public and private insurance companies around the world. It contains information on some 12,000 companies.

=== Zephyr ===
Zephyr is an information product containing M&A, IPO and venture capital deals. As of January 2015, Zephyr has information on over 1.2 million deals and rumours.

=== EIU Dataservices ===
Bureau van Dijk also work with the Economist Intelligence Unit to publish EIU DataServices – a range of economic products combined with advanced software. These include products such as EIU CountryData, EIU Country Risk Model, EIU Financial Services Indicators and Forecasts and EIU World Investment Service.

=== Country-specific databases ===
Bureau van Dijk publishes country-specific databases.

=== FACT ===
FACT is a credit risk framework made up of three main modules. Spreading and financial analysis, a risk rating engine and a credit workflow module. These can be used independently or combined for a complete end-to-end credit risk management service.

=== PUBlizard ===
PUBlizard is a white-label cloud distribution platform for eBooks and documents enabling to build digital libraries. It will securely stream EPUB3 and PDF contents to subscribers via browser & mobile applications. PUBlizard is powering products for publishers, distributors, universities, libraries, book associations and information providers such as CourseSmart and Safari Books Online.[15] (EDIT: outdated information; PUBlizard is not anymore a product of BVD)

== Zephus ==
Zephus is Bureau van Dijk's M&A research subsidiary and is based in Manchester. It is headed by Bureau van Dijk's head of M&A products, Lisa Wright. Researchers work on collating information on noteworthy deals and write M&A reports. The researchers work in over 30 languages and all relevant information is translated into English. Zephus also offers bespoke research for the media.

== See also ==
- Conduit and Sink OFCs
