= Financial Secrecy Index =

Qualitative ranking of secrecy jurisdictions

The Financial Secrecy Index (FSI) is the report published by the advocacy organization Tax Justice Network (TJN) which ranks countries by financial secrecy indicators, weighted by the economic flows of each country. (Note: Because of the weighting of the financial secrecy indicators, the FSI is often mislabeled as a quantitative index; however it is a qualitative index.)

It looks at how wealthy individuals and criminals can hide and launder money using the country's legal and financial systems. Automatic information interchange and beneficial ownership registration were among the ranking criteria. According to TJN, an estimated US$21 to US$32 trillion in untaxed or minimally taxed private financial wealth is held in secrecy jurisdictions (tax havens) around the world.

It is a measure of each jurisdiction's contribution to the worldwide financial secrecy that combines qualitative and quantitative data.

To create a secrecy score for each jurisdiction, qualitative data based on laws, regulations, cooperation with information exchange mechanisms, and other verified data sources is used.

The secrecy countries with the highest rankings are less transparent in the operations they host, less engaged in sharing information with other national authorities, and less compliant with international money-laundering laws. A secrecy jurisdiction is more appealing for channeling illegal money flows and hiding criminal and corrupt activities due to its lack of openness and unwillingness to engage in efficient information exchange.

After that, quantitative data is used to generate a global scale weighting for each jurisdiction based on its percentage of global offshore financial services activity. They did this by using publicly available data on each jurisdiction's international financial services trade. They employ the International Monetary Fund approach to extrapolate from stock measures to obtain flow estimates when incomplete data is required. The jurisdictions with the highest weighting are those that play the most important role in the market for non-resident financial services.

A jurisdiction with a substantial proportion of the offshore financial sector but low opacity may earn the same overall ranking as a smaller but more secretive jurisdiction. The rating takes into account not only which countries are the most secretive, but also magnitude (the amount to which a jurisdiction's secrecy is likely to have a worldwide impact).

== Confusion ==
While related to tax havens, the FSI is not a list of tax havens per se, and it does not attempt to estimate actual taxes avoided or profits shifted, unlike the techniques used in compilation of modern tax haven lists. The FSI is therefore more correctly a list of financial secrecy jurisdictions. While having many similarities to tax havens, the FSI produces some results that are very different from established tax haven lists.

The FSI showed jurisdictions like the U.S. and Germany, despite high tax rates, are large contributors to global financial secrecy, however, this is often misinterpreted as implying that the US and Germany are "tax havens"; for example, foreign corporates do not move to the U.S. or Germany to avoid tax. The FSI does not capture modern corporate tax havens, such as Ireland, the Netherlands and the United Kingdom, who maintain high levels of OECD–compliance and transparency, but are responsible for the global largest base erosion and profit shifting (BEPS) tax avoidance activity.

For example, Apple's Irish "leprechaun economics" tax restructure in Q1 2015, the largest BEPS transaction in history, remained unknown for years due to Irish data-protection laws. The issue is the scoring by the FSI for some of the most favored secrecy tools of modern tax havens (or Conduit OFCs): the unlimited liability company ("ULC"), trusts, and certain SPV structures (e.g. Irish QIAIFs), none of which file public accounts in havens like Ireland and the United Kingdom. The FSI focuses on ownership of these tools (e.g. is the owner of a ULC recorded), versus visibility into the tools (e.g. is the ULC paying tax). An example of this disconnect, was the EU's €13 billion tax fine on Apple's two Irish ULCs in 2016, (Note: Apple Sales International ("ASI"), and Apple Operations Europe ("AOE")) who while known, were found by the EU to be avoiding large amounts of Irish tax during the 2004–2014 period.

== History ==
The biennial FSI releases are widely reported in the general and financial media, and FSI scores now are seen in EU reports.

== See also ==
- Conduit and Sink OFCs
- Corporate tax haven
- Ireland as a tax haven
- Offshore financial centre
- Tax haven
- United States as a tax haven
