= United States as a tax haven =

The United States "is effectively the biggest tax haven in the world"

— Andrew Penney, Rothschild & Co.

In 2010, the United States implemented the Foreign Account Tax Compliance Act; the law required financial firms around the world to report accounts held by US citizens to the Internal Revenue Service. The US on the other hand refused the Common Reporting Standard set up by the Organisation for Economic Co-operation and Development, alongside Vanuatu and Bahrain.

This means the US receives tax and asset information for American assets and income abroad, but does not share information about what happens in the United States with other countries. In other words, it has become attractive as a tax haven.

== Extent ==
The Tax Justice Network ranks the US third in terms of the secrecy and scale of its offshore financial industry, behind Switzerland and Hong Kong but ahead of the Cayman Islands and Luxembourg. The United States has been popular as a destination for offshore funds for Chinese investors, said Canadian financial crimes expert Bill Majcher, because investors think it will resist pressure from China. Andrew Penney from Rothschild & Co described the US as "effectively the biggest tax haven in the world" and Trident Trust Co., one of the world's biggest providers of offshore trusts, moved dozens of accounts out of Switzerland and Grand Cayman, and into Sioux Falls, saying: "Cayman was slammed in December, closing things that people were withdrawing ... I was surprised at how many were coming across that were formerly Swiss bank accounts, but they want out of Switzerland."

A 2012 study by various US universities showed that the US has the most lenient regulations for setting up a shell company anywhere in the world outside of Kenya. Tax havens such as the Cayman Islands, Jersey and the Bahamas were far less permissive, researchers found, than states such as Nevada, Delaware, Montana, South Dakota, Wyoming and New York. "[Americans] discovered that they really don't need to go to Panama", said James Henry of the Tax Justice Network. For example, a single address in Wilmington (1209 North Orange Street) is listed as the headquarters for at least 285,000 separate businesses due to Delaware's desirable corporate taxes and law. As of 2016, it was estimated that 9 billion dollars of potential taxes were lost over the past decade, due to the Delaware 'loophole'. Both Hillary Clinton and Donald Trump have firms registered in North Orange Street, and lawyers, trust companies and financial firms including Rothschild & Co are moving offshore accounts from locations such as Switzerland and the Cayman Islands into the US to take advantage of the country's loose regulations, calling it the "new Switzerland" (see Banking in Switzerland).

Mark Hays of Global Witness said "the US is one of the easiest places to set up so-called anonymous shell companies", and Stefanie Ostfeld from the same organization said that "the US is just as big a secrecy jurisdiction as so many of these Caribbean countries and Panama". More than 1.1 million live legal entities were incorporated in Delaware at the end of 2014. An increasing number – more than 70% – of those were LLC. The Delaware Division of Corporations said in August 2015 that "an LLC entices all types of people since it is easy to operate and oversee", and Delaware is currently one of the few states without sales tax. Delaware does not tax the companies that operate there, nor does it tax their royalty income. However, the LLC is more popular and often less expensive in states such as Wyoming, Nevada and Oregon. Approximately 668,000 anonymous LLCs are registered just in those three states.

Parts of the country serve as havens for others, and for covert governmental actions. In the 1980s the Central Intelligence Agency (CIA) used Guam as the location for a trust incorporation. The CIA then used Guam as an offshore haven both from taxes and from scrutiny in the course of operating a Hawaiian front company.

The European Union includes the US Territories of American Samoa, Guam and the U.S. Virgin Islands in its list of non-cooperative jurisdictions for tax purposes.

In 2024, Wyoming was the state with the most corporate registrations per capita.

On January 20, 2025, President Donald Trump withdrew the United States from the Global minimum corporate tax rate.

== Pandora Papers, 2021 ==
The October 2021 release of the Pandora Papers revealed details of a number of non-U.S. figures who have used U.S. tax haven services. These include 35 world leaders and over 100 billionaires, celebrities, and business leaders.

== See also ==
- Delaware General Corporation Law
- Nevada corporation
- Panama as a tax haven
- Panama Papers
- Reactions to the Panama Papers
- Ireland as a tax haven
- Wyoming as a corporate haven
