= Panama as a tax haven =

One of the oldest and best-known tax havens in the Caribbean

The Republic of Panama is one of the oldest and best-known tax havens in the Caribbean, as well as one of the most established in the region. Panama has had a reputation for tax avoidance since the early 20th century, and Panama has been cited repeatedly in recent years as a jurisdiction which does not cooperate with international tax transparency initiatives.

Panama's offshore sector is intimately tied to the Panama Canal, which has made it a gateway and entrepôt for international trade. There are strong similarities between Panama and other leading tax havens like Hong Kong, Singapore and Dubai. On paper at least, Panama has the largest shipping fleet in the world, greater than those of the US and China combined, according to the Tax Justice Network.

== Background (1910s–1970s) ==
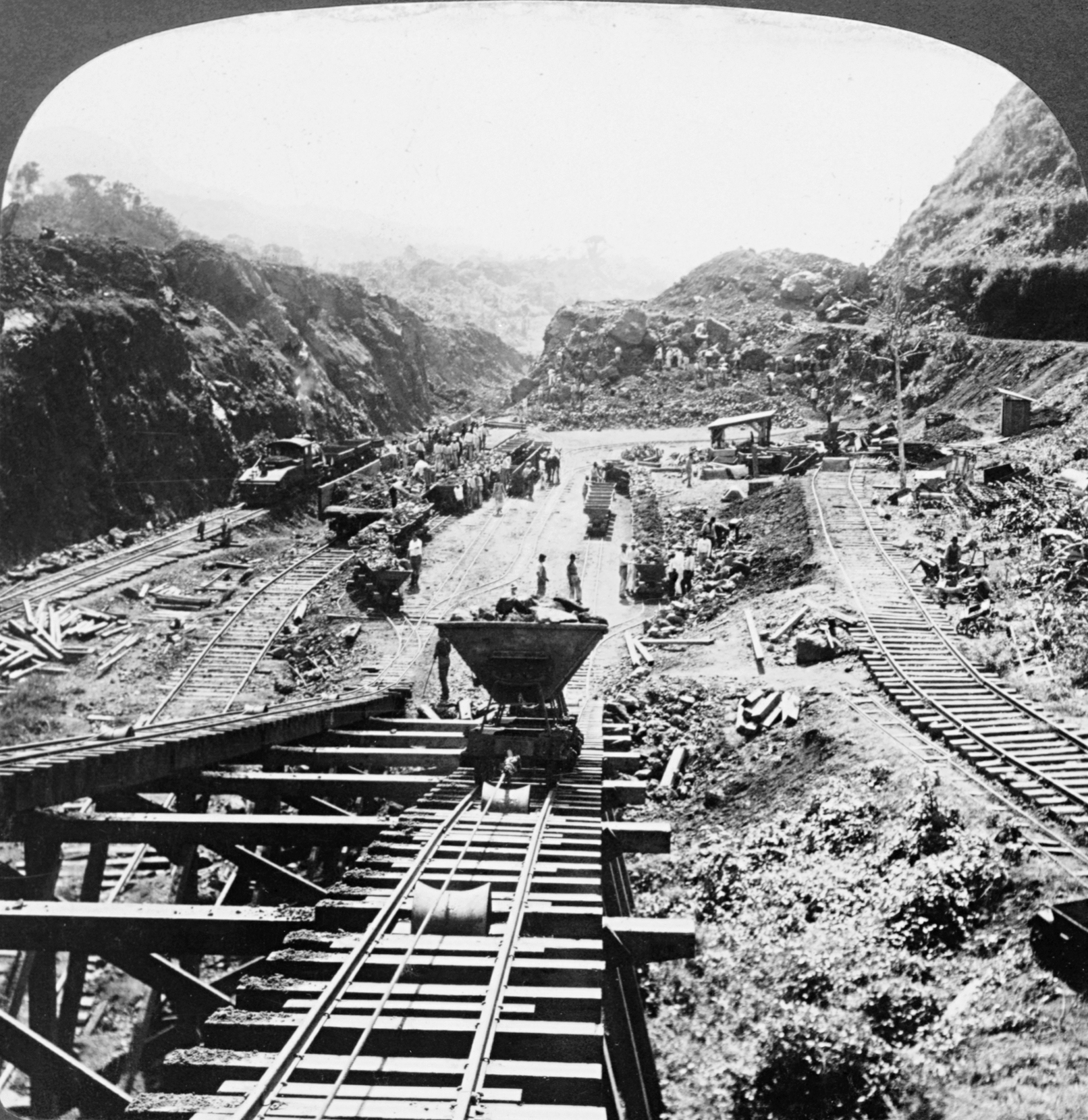
Construction work on the Gaillard Cut of the Panama Canal, 1907

A 2014 investigation by journalist Ken Silverstein published in Vice Magazine explains how Panama came into being, with US help:

In 1903, the administration of Theodore Roosevelt created the country after bullying Colombia to hand over what was then the province of Panama. Roosevelt acted at the behest of various banking groups, among them J. P. Morgan & Co., which was appointed as the country's official "fiscal agent".

The Roosevelt administration sought to foment armed rebellion by Panamanian nationalists, forcing Panama away from a politically fragile Colombia. Roosevelt achieved this goal with the help of William Nelson Cromwell, a well-connected US Republican lawyer and also legal counsel for JP Morgan's railroad interests. The administration's key objective was allegedly to install a pro-US Panamanian government that would secure US rights over the Panama Canal. The Hay–Bunau-Varilla Treaty resulted, establishing permanent U.S. rights to a Panama Canal Zone several miles wide, across the neck of the isthmus. Panama became independent from Colombia the same month, and the Panama Canal opened in 1914.

According to a 2013 academic study published by the Norwegian Center for Taxation, Panama's reputation as a tax haven began in the year 1919, when it began registering foreign ships in order to help Standard Oil avoid US taxes and regulations; other US ship owners followed, some seeking to avoid the higher wages and better working conditions imposed by US legislation such as the Seaman's Act and safety standards for sea vessels. Also, during the Prohibition era, US passenger ships were allowed to serve alcohol to their customers without breaking the law if they had Panamanian registration.

Within a few years, Panama extended its minimalist approach to taxation, regulation and financial disclosure requirements to the world of offshore finance. According to the study, "Wall Street interests helped Panama introduce lax company incorporation laws, which let anyone start tax-free, anonymous corporations, with few questions asked".

== Background (1970s–present) ==
For decades, offshore finance had a relatively modest profile in Panama, but it took off in the 1970s as world oil prices surged. During this time, the Republic of Panama passed legislation "entrenching corporate and individual financial secrecy".

By 1982, partly attracted by business opportunities deriving from the Panama Canal and its free trade zone, more than 100 international banks had offices in Panama City.

According to Investopedia: "Panama's offshore jurisdiction offers a wide array of excellent financial services, including offshore banking, the incorporation of offshore companies, registration of ships and the formation of Panama trusts and foundations." In Panama, no taxes are imposed on offshore companies which engage in business solely outside of the jurisdiction; therefore, the companies which are incorporated in the Republic of Panama and the owners of these companies are exempt from corporate taxes, withholding taxes, capital gains tax, local taxes, estate taxes and inheritance tax. However, businesses within Panama itself are permitted to conduct business there so long as the company pays its local taxes.

Panama has been cited repeatedly in recent years by the State Department of the United States and the International Monetary Fund (IMF) as a jurisdiction which does not cooperate with international tax transparency initiatives due to the legislation which regulates the country's offshore jurisdiction and financial services. Panama has over 350,000 international business companies (IBCs) registered, the third largest number in the world after Hong Kong and the Virgin Islands. Alongside incorporation of IBCs, Panama is active in forming tax-evading foundations and trusts, insurance, and boat and shipping registration, according to the Tax Justice Network.

=== Financial privacy ===
Countries with politicians, public officials or close associates implicated in the Panama Papers leak on April 15, 2016

An extensive amount of legislation currently exists in the Republic of Panama to protect corporate and financial privacy. However, organisations such as the Tax Justice Network and other advocacy groups and non-governmental organisations state that the main intention of these laws is financial secrecy, as opposed to privacy.

The names of shareholders of Panamanian corporations, trusts and foundations are still not required by law to be publicly registered. Panama has no exchange controls: this means that for individual clients of Panama's offshore banking, as well as for offshore business entities incorporated in Panama, there are no limits or reporting requirements on money transfers into or out of the country.

Panama also has very strict banking secrecy laws: for example, it is forbidden for Panamanian banks to share any information about offshore bank accounts or account holders, except under special circumstances instigated by the Panamanian authorities. Such regulation has made it difficult to investigate the true extent of the Panama Papers leak, as severe criminal penalties are enacted to individuals who breach confidentiality.

Despite this, Panama does not appear on the Tax Justice Network's top ten list for financial secrecy, with Alex Cobham of Tax Justice Network saying "There is a double standard: many developed countries host or support jurisdictions where there is an absence of financial transparency".

== Accusations ==
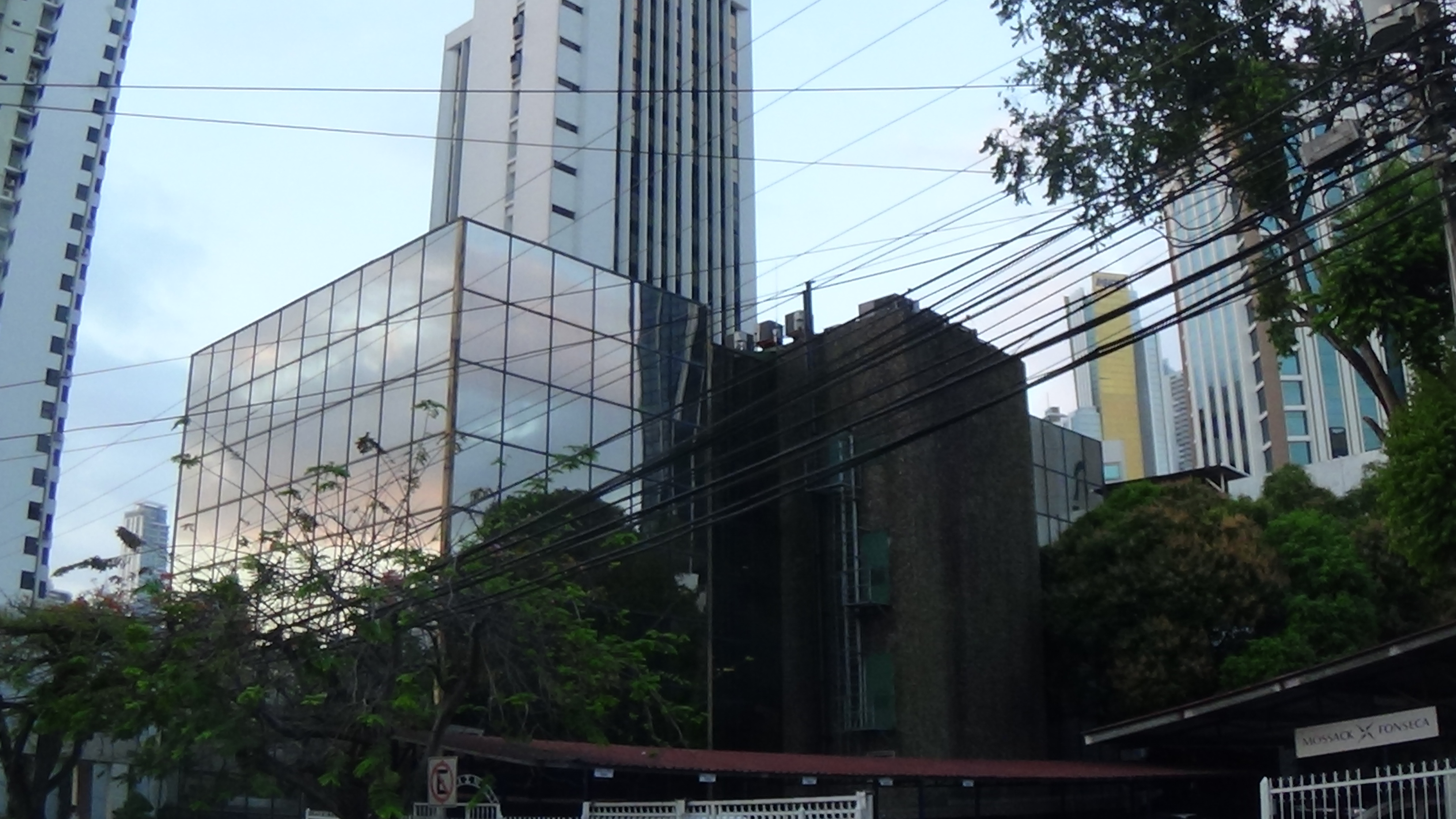
Mossack Fonseca headquarters

Pascal Saint Amans, Director of the Centre for Tax Policy and Administration in the OECD said: "From the standpoint of reputation, Panama is still the only place where people still believe they can hide their money." Writing for VICE News, Ken Silverstein explained the Mossack Fonseca history in the region: "These laws attracted a long line of 'dirtbags' and dictators who used Panama to hide their stolen loot, including Ferdinand Marcos, 'Baby Doc' Duvalier, and Augusto Pinochet. When Manuel Noriega, commander of the Panama Defence Forces, took power in Panama in 1983, Silverstein said, Noriega essentially nationalised the money-laundering business; he partnered with the Medellin drug cartel and gave it free rein to operate in the country."

In the United Kingdom, Private Eye used data collected from the Land Registry to create "an easily searchable online map ... of properties in England and Wales owned by offshore companies. It reveals for the first time the extent of the British property interests held by companies based in tax havens." Most of these properties are tax avoidance vehicles and in some cases also to conceal wealth of dubious origin."

A 2003 examination of tax havens by Jeffrey Robinson quotes a US Customs official as saying:

[Panama] is filled with dishonest lawyers, dishonest bankers, dishonest company formation agents and dishonest companies registered there by those dishonest lawyers so that they can deposit dirty money into their dishonest banks. The Free Trade Zone is the black hole through which Panama has become one of the filthiest money laundering sinks in the world.

=== Tax Justice Network ===
The advocacy group the Tax Justice Network has described Panama as "the recipient of drugs money from Latin America, plus ample other sources of dirty money from the US and elsewhere". It said "now is a good moment to draw attention to how Panama developed as a secrecy jurisdiction and how it continues to provide full service – wash, rinse and dry – to crooks and money launderers from around the world."

== Response ==
Ramón Fonseca Mora, the co-founder of Mossack Fonseca, told the New York Times: "I assure you there is more dirty money in New York, Miami and London than there is in Panama". The United States is an alleged tax haven despite the Foreign Account Tax Compliance Act. The US has refused the Common Reporting Standard set up by the Organisation for Economic Co-operation and Development. This means the US receives tax and asset information for American assets and income abroad, but does not share information about what happens in the United States with other countries; in other words, the US has become attractive as a tax haven.

== See also ==
- United States as a tax haven
- Mossack Fonseca
- Blairmore Holdings
- Ireland as a tax haven
