= Treasure Islands =

2011 non-fiction book by Nicholas Shaxson

Treasure Islands: Tax Havens and the Men who Stole the World
- First edition (UK)
- Author: Nicholas Shaxson
- Language: English
- Publisher: The Bodley Head (UK); St. Martin's Press (US)
- Publication date: 6 January 2011
- Publication place: United Kingdom

Treasure Islands: Tax Havens and the Men who Stole the World (2011) is a non-fiction book about the secretive role of offshore banks and tax havens in global economic affairs. The book was written by Nicholas Shaxson, a political analyst and associate Fellow of the Royal Institute of International Affairs. It was first published on 6 January 2011.

The publication is promoted by the Tax Justice Network.

== Content ==
- The author estimates in the book that around $12 trillion, a quarter of the world's wealth, goes untaxed in tax havens. If banks and companies were included, the amount would be at least twice that. Every FTSE 100 company has subsidiaries or partners in tax havens to avoid tax.
- Shaxson writes that the United States and the United Kingdom are the biggest tax havens in the world, claiming that the US (Delaware, Wyoming, Florida and Nevada) is responsible for approximately 21 percent of offshore business, while the UK is responsible for about 20 percent. A further 10 percent derives from trade carried out through Britain's dependent territories. Switzerland is responsible for around 6 percent of the offshore trade.
- London is described as the centre of a spider web that links to the Channel Islands, the Isle of Man and the Caribbean, serving the needs of global capital.

== Reviews ==
Reviews have mostly been positive:

- The Irish Times called Treasure Islands an excellent book – breathtaking and terrifying – that explains how tax evasion of multinational companies has disastrous consequences for global politics and human well-being.
- According to Financial Times journalist Alice Ross, the book "combines meticulous research with amusing anecdotes, resulting in a very readable account of the murky world of offshore and a strong moral message that the system needs to be changed".
- Nancy Folbre, professor at University of Massachusetts Amherst and a regular writer for the New York Times Economix blog, called the book "A fascinating narrative that is both analytically compelling and rich in institutional detail", which argues "that the globalization of tax evasion is undermining fiscal and economic stability in developed and developing nations alike".
- The investment website Seeking Alpha described it as an "excellent book on the global offshore tax system".

== Adaptation ==
A documentary thriller called Cashback was being produced and due for release in 2012, but as of 2015 didn't work out, as noted by Nicholas Shaxson. It was to be directed by the two British brothers, Marc and Nick Francis, the film makers behind the award-winning film Black Gold.

== Awards and honors ==
- 2012 Bread and Roses Award, shortlist.

== See also ==
- Tax haven
- Corporate tax haven
- Double Irish arrangement
- Ireland as a tax haven
