= Ireland as a tax haven =

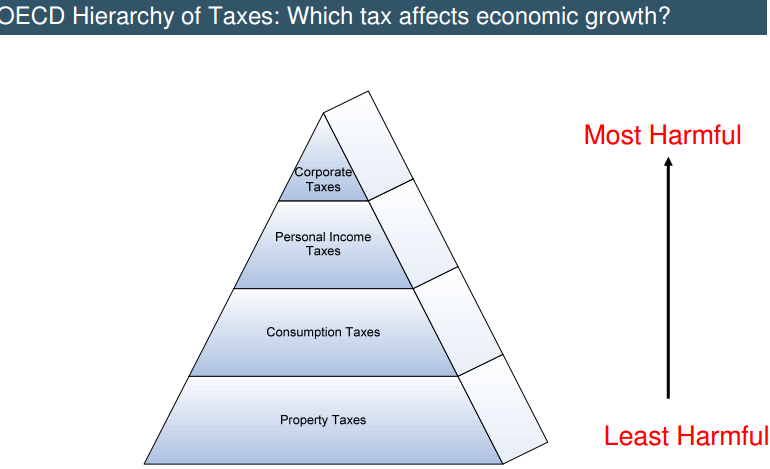
Ireland summarises its taxation policy using the OECD's Hierarchy of Taxes pyramid, which emphasises high corporate tax rates as the types of tax most harmful to economic growth.

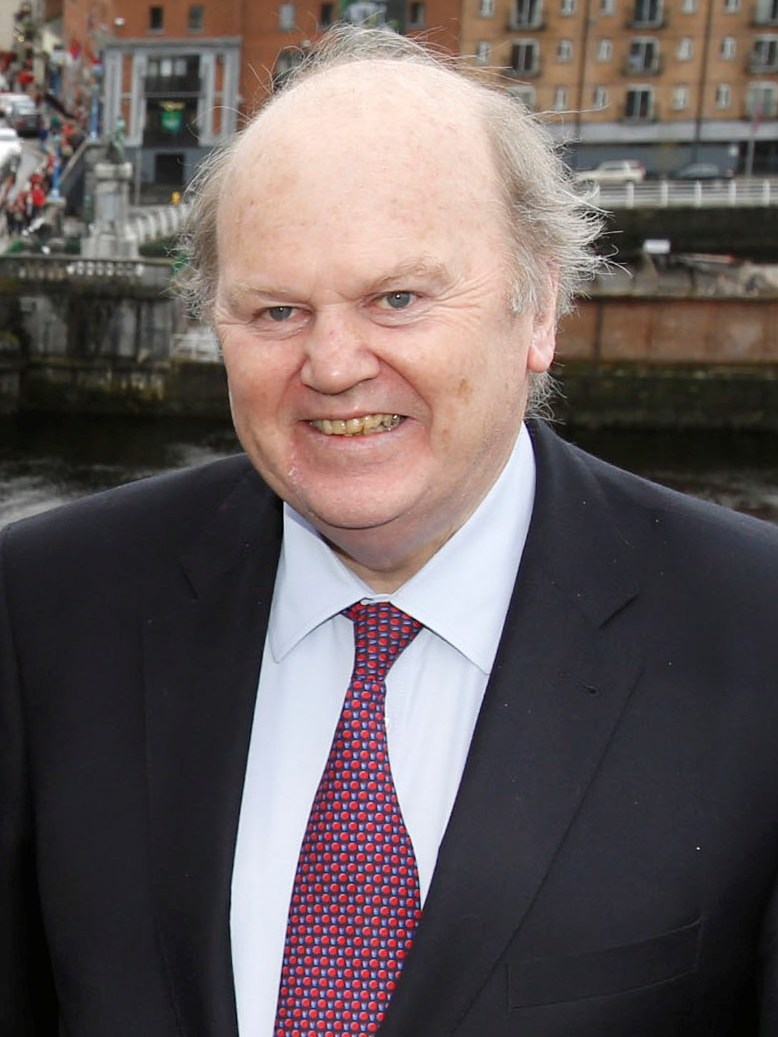
Irish Finance Minister Michael Noonan (2011–2017) told an Irish MEP to "put on the green jersey" when told of a new tax scheme to replace the "Double Irish".

Ireland has been labelled as a corporate tax haven in multiple financial reports, an allegation which the state has rejected. (Note: Ireland has also been labelled an "offshore financial centre" (OFC) and also a "Conduit OFC", which tax academics consider to be synomonous with tax havens, however, unlike the tax haven label, Ireland does not raise formal objection to OFC labels) Ireland is on all academic tax haven lists, including the § Leaders in tax haven research, and tax NGOs. Ireland does not meet the 1998 OECD definition of a tax haven, but no OECD member, including Switzerland, ever met this definition; only Trinidad and Tobago met it in 2017. Similarly, no EU–28 country is amongst the 64 listed in the 2017 EU tax haven blacklist and greylist. In September 2016, Brazil became the first G20 country to "blacklist" Ireland as a tax haven.

Ireland's base erosion and profit shifting (BEPS) tools give some foreign corporates § Effective tax rates of 0% to 2.5% (Note: The 0% rate is from the Double Irish and Single Malt BEPS tools; the Capital Allowances for Intangible Assets (CAIA) (or Green Jersey) BEPS tool has a normal effective rate of 2.5%, but was temporarily reduced to 0% in 2015 for Apple's leprechaun economics restructuring) on global profits re-routed to Ireland via their tax treaty network. (Note: The U.S. multinational use of Irish BEPS schemes such as the Double Irish are sometimes mis-understood as being only used for EU–sourced revenues. For example, in 2016, Facebook recorded global revenues of $27 billion, while Facebook in Ireland paid €30 million in Irish tax on Irish revenues of €13 billion (approximately half of all global revenues). Similarly, when the EU introduced the GDPR regulations in 2018, Facebook disclosed that all of its non–U.S. accounts (circa 1.9 billion, of which 1.5 billion were non–E.U), were legally based in Dublin. Similarly, Google is also believed to run most of its non–U.S. sales revenue and profits through its Dublin operation.) (Note: In September 2018, Ireland had a global network of 73 bilateral tax treaties, and a 74th with Ghana awaiting ratification.) Ireland's aggregate § Effective tax rates for foreign corporates is 2.2–4.5%. Ireland's BEPS tools are the world's largest BEPS flows, exceed the entire Caribbean system, and artificially inflate the US–EU trade deficit. Ireland's tax-free QIAIF and L–QIAIF regimes, and Section 110 SPVs, enable foreign investors to avoid Irish taxes on Irish assets, and can be combined with Irish BEPS tools to create confidential routes out of the Irish corporate tax system. (Note: Both the IMF, and the Conduit and Sink OFCs study, show that Luxembourg is by far the most popular destination for capital leaving Ireland; the IMF estimates that over half of the capital leaving Ireland goes to Luxembourg.) As these structures are OECD–whitelisted, Ireland's laws and regulations allow the use of data protection and data privacy provisions, and opt-outs from filing of public accounts, to obscure their effects. There is arguable evidence that Ireland acts as a § Captured state, fostering tax strategies.

Ireland's situation is attributed to § Political compromises arising from the historical U.S. "worldwide" corporate tax system, which has made U.S. multinationals the largest users of tax havens, and BEPS tools, in the world. (Note: Non–U.S. tax academics have labelled Washington's tolerance of U.S. multinationals using tax havens as an "exorbitant tax privilege", however U.S. tax academics (Hines 2010, Dryeng and Lindsey, 2009.), have shown that U.S. multinational use of tax havens (U.S. multinationals are the largest users of tax havens in the world), has maximised long-term U.S. exchequer, and/or shareholder returns, at the expense of other higher-tax foreign countries (see § Source of contradictions)) The U.S. Tax Cuts and Jobs Act of 2017 ("TCJA"), and move to a hybrid "territorial" tax system, (Note: The TCJA system is described as hybrid, because it still forces minimum U.S. tax rates on foreign income under the TCJA GILTI regime.) removed the need for some of these compromises. In 2018, IP–heavy S&P500 multinationals guided similar post-TCJA effective tax rates, whether they are legally based in the U.S. (e.g. Pfizer (Note: S&P500 company, Pfizer reported that its 2019 tax rate would be circa 17 per cent, while S&P500 company, Medtronic, an Irish tax inversion, reported a rate of 15–16 per cent.)), or Ireland (e.g. Medtronic). While TCJA neutralised some Irish BEPS tools, it enhanced others (e.g. Apple's "CAIA" (Note: The Capital Allowances for Intangible Assets (CAIA) Irish BEPS tool, is also known as the #Green Jersey. The U.S. GILTI anti-BEPS regime accepts CAIA's intangible capital allowances as deductible against GILTI tax. Thus, the CAIA's 0–2.5% effective Irish tax rate, under U.S. TCJA participation relief, now also becomes a 0–2.5% effective U.S. tax rate)). A reliance on U.S. corporates (80% of Irish corporation tax, 25% of Irish labour, 25 of top 50 Irish firms, and 57% of Irish value-add), is a concern in Ireland. (Note: U.S. corporates also includes U.S. tax inversions to Ireland such as Medtronic, whose effective operations, including executive team and operational headquarters, are all U.S.-based.)

Ireland's weakness in attracting corporates from "territorial" tax systems (Table 1), (Note: Ireland has no foreign corporates that are non–U.S./non–UK in its top 50 companies by revenue, and only one by employees (German Lidl, which sells into Ireland). The UK multinationals in Ireland are either selling into Ireland (e.g. Tesco), or date from before 2009–2012, after which the UK overhauled its tax system and moved to a "territorial tax" model. Since 2009–12, the UK has become a major tax haven in its own right, competing with Ireland for US tax inversions. Since 2009–12, no UK multinationals have moved to Ireland, and, in 2014, the UK HMRC reported that most prior UK corporate tax inversions to Ireland had returned. The U.S. multinationals in Ireland date from prior to the 2017 TCJA, after which the US moved to a hybrid-"territorial tax" model.) was apparent in its failure to attract material financial services jobs moving due to Brexit (e.g. no US investment banks or material financial services franchise). Ireland's diversification into full tax haven tools (Note: These are structures set up to rival and compete for business from traditional tax haven tools such as the Cayman Islands SPC, for which Irish QIAIFs have specific provisions to support transferring SPC assets without tax leakage) (e.g. QIAIF, L–QIAIF, and ICAV), has seen tax-law firms, and offshore magic circle firms, set up Irish offices to handle Brexit-driven tax restructuring. These tools made Ireland the world's 3rd largest Shadow Banking OFC, and 5th largest Conduit OFC.

== Context ==
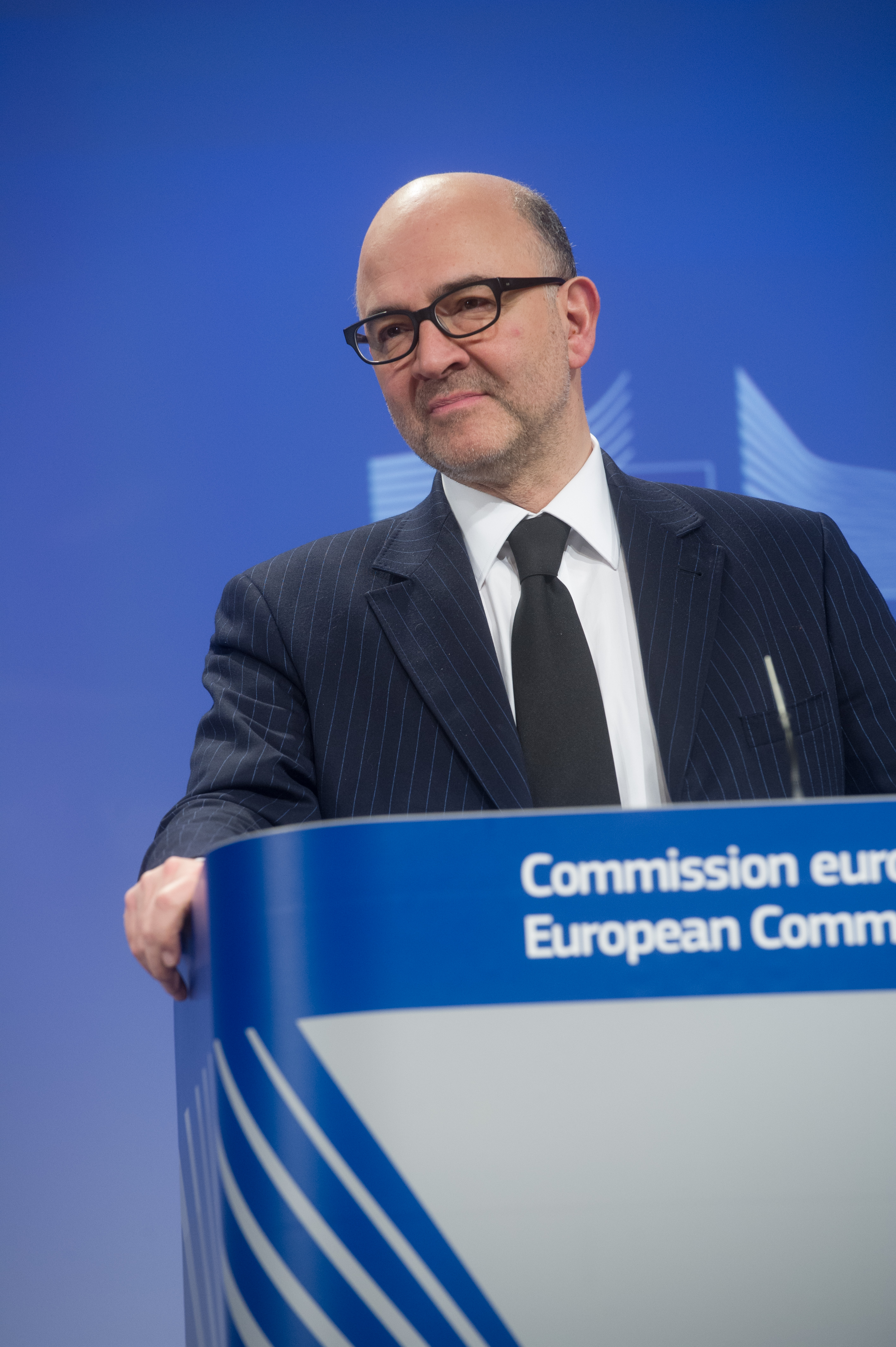
Pierre Moscovici, EU Tax Commissioner, said on 24 January 2017, the EU did not consider Ireland a tax haven, but on 18 January 2018 said that Ireland was a tax blackhole.

Ireland has been associated with the term "tax haven" since the U.S. IRS produced a list on 12 January 1981. (Note: Ireland was listed as a manufacturing tax haven in the U.S. Internal Revenue Service (IRS) (1981) Tax Haven and Their Use by United States Taxpayers (The Gordon Report). Washington, D.C.: Special Council for International Taxation, Internal Revenue Service) Ireland has been a consistent feature on almost every non-governmental tax haven list from Hines in February 1994, to Zucman in June 2018 (and each one in-between). However, Ireland has never been considered a tax haven by either the OECD or the EU Commission. These two contrasting facts are used by various sides, to allegedly prove or disprove that Ireland is a tax haven, and much of the detail in-between is discarded, some of which can explain the EU and OECD's position. Confusing scenarios have emerged, for example:

- In April 2000, the FSF–IMF listed Ireland as an offshore financial centre ("OFC"), based on criteria which academics and the OECD support. The Irish State has never refuted the OFC label, and there are Irish State documents that note Ireland as an OFC. Yet, the terms OFC and "tax haven" are often considered synonymous.
- In December 2017, the EU did not consider Ireland to be a tax haven, and Ireland is not in the § EU 2017 tax haven lists; in January 2017 the EU Commissioner for Taxation, Pierre Moscovici, stated this publicly. However, the same Commissioner in January 2018, described Ireland to the EU Parliament as a tax black hole.
- In September 2018, the 29th Chair of the U.S. President's Council of Economic Advisors, tax-expert Kevin Hassett, said that: "It’s not Ireland’s fault U.S. tax law was written by someone on acid". Hassett, however, had labelled Ireland as a tax haven in November 2017, when advocating for the Tax Cuts and Jobs Act of 2017 ("TCJA").

The next sections chronicle the detail regarding Ireland's label as a tax haven (most cited Sources and Evidence), and detail regarding the Irish State's official Rebuttals of the label (both technical and non-technical). The final section chronicles the academic research on the drivers of U.S., EU, and OCED, decision making regarding Ireland.

== Labels ==
Ireland has been labelled a tax haven, or a corporate tax haven (or Conduit OFC), by:

1. The main § Leaders in tax haven research: James R. Hines Jr. (1994, 2007, 2010), Dhammika Dharmapala (2008 and 2009), and Gabriel Zucman (2013, 2014 and 2018);
2. Other important § Leaders in tax haven research: Joel Slemrod (2006), and Mihir A. Desai (2006);
3. Notable academic studies by the University of Amsterdam's CORPNET in 2017 (Conduit and Sink OFCs) and by the International Monetary Fund journal in 2018;
4. Various academic tax-policy centres in Germany, the United Kingdom, the United Nations, and Ireland itself;
5. The Institute on Taxation and Economic Policy and Oxfam. In 2021, the Tax Justice Network ranked Ireland 11th in its list of enablers of global corporate tax abuse after The British Virgin Islands, The Cayman Islands, Bermuda, The Netherlands, Switzerland, Luxembourg, Hong Kong, Jersey, Singapore, and The United Arab Emirates. The Tax Justice Network estimates that Ireland facilitates US$16bn in taxes lost each year by other countries.
6. The two U.S. Congressional investigations into global tax havens: 2008 by the Government Accountability Office, and 2015 by the Congressional Research Service.
7. The 2013 Levin–McCain U.S. Senate Permanent Subcommittee on Investigation ("PSI") into tax avoidance activities of U.S. multinationals by using "profit shifting" BEPS tools;
8. The books on tax havens in the last decade, with at least 300 citations on Google Scholar: Tax Havens: How Globalization Really Works, by Ronen Palan and Richard Murphy from 2010, Treasure Islands: Tax Havens and the Men Who Stole the World, by Nicholas Shaxson from 2011, and The Hidden Wealth of Nations: The Scourge of Tax Havens, by Gabriel Zucman from 2015;
9. The main financial media: New York Times, Bloomberg News, the Wall Street Journal, Forbes, the Financial Times, The Economist, the Washington Post, and Fortune;
10. Some leading economists;
11. G20 economy, Brazil, who blacklisted Ireland in September 2016; and potentially the U.S. State of Oregon whose State IRS recommended blacklisting Ireland in 2017.
12. The European Parliament in March 2019 voted to accept a report by 505 votes in favour to 63 against, recommending Ireland, as one several "EU tax havens", be included on the official EU Commission list of tax havens. (Note: The European Parliament vote is not binding on the EU Commission to formally include these "EU tax havens" in the official EU list of tax havens (blacklist or greylist); to be binding, it must be a unanimous vote by all member states.)

Ireland has also been labelled related terms to being a tax haven:

1. In Germany, the related term tax dumping has been used against Ireland by German political leaders;
2. The Financial Stability Forum ("FSF") and the International Monetary Fund ("IMF") listed Ireland as an offshore financial centre in June 2000;
3. Bloomberg, in an article on PwC Ireland's managing partner Feargal O'Rourke, used the term tax avoidance hub;
4. The 2013 U.S Senate PSI Levin–McCain investigation into U.S. multinational tax activity, called Ireland the holy grail of tax avoidance;
5. As the OECD has never listed any of its 35 members as tax havens, Ireland, Luxembourg, the Netherlands and Switzerland are called OECD tax havens;
6. As the EU Commission has never formally listed any of its 28 members as tax havens, Ireland, Luxembourg, the Netherlands and Belgium are called EU tax havens.

The term tax haven has been used by the Irish mainstream media and leading Irish commentators. Irish elected TDs have asked the question: "Is Ireland a tax haven?". A search of Dáil Éireann debates lists 871 references to the term. Some established Irish political parties accuse the Irish State of tax haven activities.

The international community at this point is concerned about the nature of tax havens, and Ireland in particular is viewed with a considerable amount of suspicion in the international community for doing what is considered – at the very least – on the boundaries of acceptable practices.

— Ashoka Mody, Ex-IMF mission chief to Ireland, "Former IMF official warns Ireland to prepare for end to tax regime", 21 June 2018.

== OECD plans ==
While Ireland has been considered a tax haven by many for decades, the global tax system that Ireland depends on to incentivize multinational corporations to move there is receiving an overhaul by a coalition of 130 nations. This would cause changes to Ireland's official corporate tax rate of 12.5%, and the associated rules sometimes described as helping companies based there avoid paying taxes to other countries where they make profits. Originally Ireland was one of the few countries (one of nine) to oppose signing up for reform to a global minimum corporate tax rate of 15% and to force technology and retail companies to pay taxes based on where their goods and services were sold, rather than where the company was located. The Irish government would eventually agree to the terms of the deal after some debate. As of 7 October 2021 Ireland dropped its opposition to an overhaul of global corporate tax rules giving up its 12.5% tax rate. The Irish Cabinet approved an increase from 12.5% to 15% in corporation tax for companies with turnover in excess of 750 million euros. Additionally, the Irish Department of Finance has estimated that joining this global deal would reduce the country's tax take by 2 billion euros ($2.3 billion) a year, according to RTE. The other countries party to this deal did have to agree to compromise on a few key issues involved in the reform, dropping the "at least" in the statement "minimum corporate tax rate of at least 15%” updating it to just 15% — signaling that the rate would not be pushed up at a later date. Ireland was also given assurances that it could keep the lower rate for smaller firms located in the country.

== Evidence ==
=== Global U.S. BEPS hub ===
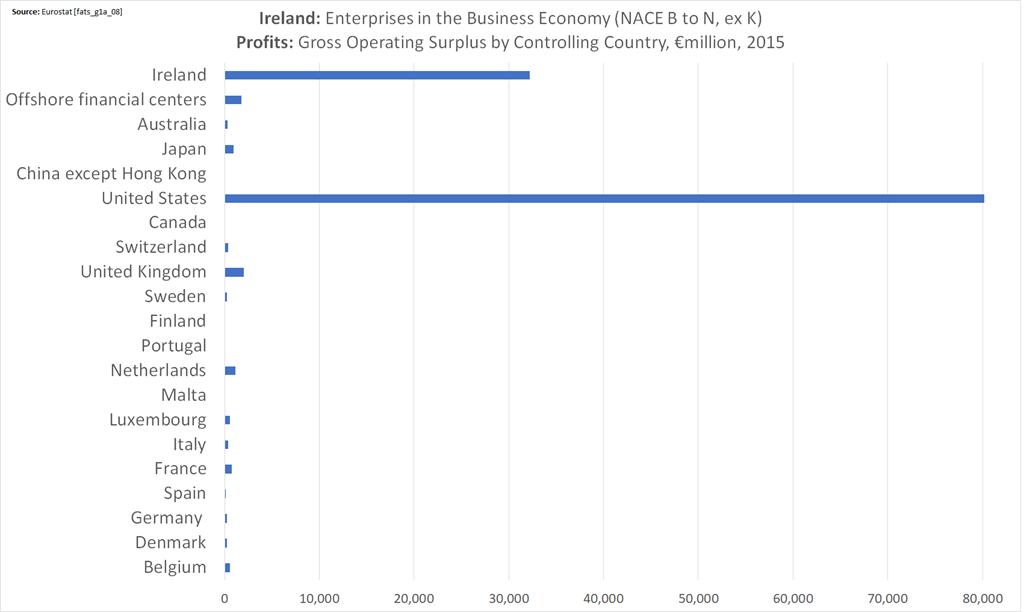
Dominance of U.S. companies: Irish corporate Gross Operating Surplus (i.e. profits), by the controlling country of the company (note: a material part of the Irish figure is also from U.S. tax inversions who are U.S.–controlled). Eurostat (2015).

Ireland ranks in all non-political "tax haven lists" going back to the first lists in 1994, and features in all "proxy tests" for tax havens and "quantitative measures" of tax havens. The level of base erosion and profit shifting (BEPS) by U.S. multinationals in Ireland is so large, that in 2017 the Central Bank of Ireland abandoned GDP/GNP as a statistic to replace it with Modified gross national income (GNI*). Economists note that Ireland's distorted GDP is now distorting the EU's aggregate GDP, and has artificially inflated the trade-deficit between the EU and the US. (see Table 1).

Ireland's IP–based BEPS tools use "intellectual property" ("IP") to "shift profits" from higher-tax locations, with whom Ireland has bilateral tax treaties, back to Ireland. Once in Ireland, these tools reduce Irish corporate taxes by re-routing to say Bermuda with the Double Irish BEPS tool (e.g. as Google and Facebook did), or to Malta with the Single Malt BEPS tool (e.g. as Microsoft and Allergan did), or by writing-off internally created virtual assets against Irish corporate tax with the Capital Allowances for Intangible Assets ("CAIA") BEPS tool (e.g. as Apple did post 2015). These BEPS tools give an Irish corporate effective tax rate (ETR) of 0–2.5%. They are the world's largest BEPS tools, and exceed the aggregate flows of the Caribbean tax system.

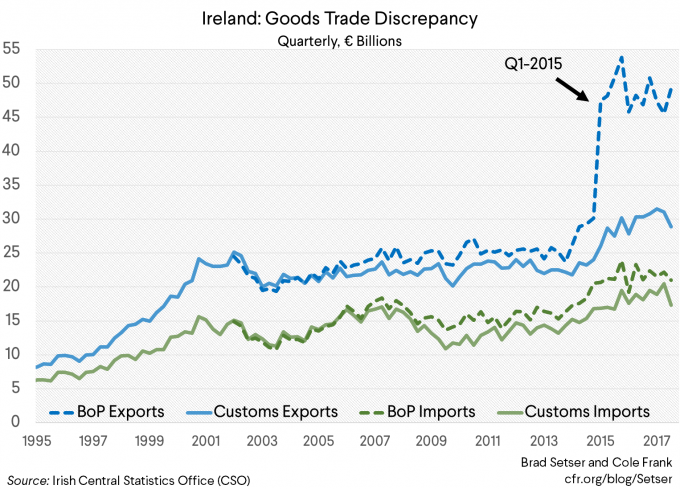
Apple's Q1 2015 Irish restructuring is the largest BEPS action in history, and led to the replacement of GDP by GNI*. Setser & Frank (CoFR),

Ireland has received the most U.S. corporate tax inversions of any global jurisdiction, or tax haven, since the first U.S. tax inversion in 1983.

While IP–based BEPS tools are the majority of Irish BEPS flows, they were developed from Ireland's traditional expertise in inter-group contract manufacturing, or transfer pricing–based (TP) BEPS tools (e.g. capital allowance schemes, inter-group cross-border charging), which still provide material employment in Ireland (e.g. from U.S. life sciences firms). Some corporates like Apple maintain expensive Irish contract manufacturing TP–based BEPS operations (versus cheaper options in Asia, like Apple's Foxconn), to give "substance" to their larger Irish IP–based BEPS tools.

By refusing to implement the 2013 EU Accounting Directive (and invoking exemptions on reporting holding company structures until 2022), Ireland enables their TP and IP–based BEPS tools to structure as "unlimited liability companies" ("ULC") which do not have to file public accounts with the Irish CRO.

Ireland's Debt–based BEPS tools (e.g. the Section 110 SPV), have made Ireland the 3rd largest global Shadow Banking OFC, and have been used by Russian banks to circumvent sanctions. Irish Section 110 SPVs offer "orphaning" to protect the identity of the owner, and to shield the owner from Irish tax (the Section 110 SPV is an Irish company). They were used by U.S. distressed debt funds to avoid billions in Irish taxes, assisted by Irish tax-law firms using in-house Irish children's charities to complete the orphan structure, that enabled the U.S. distressed debt funds to export the gains on their Irish assets, free of any Irish taxes or duties, to Luxembourg and the Caribbean (see Section 110 abuse).

Unlike the TP and IP–based BEPS tools, Section 110 SPVs must file public accounts with the Irish CRO, which was how the above abuses were discovered in 2016–17. In February 2018 the Central Bank of Ireland upgraded the little-used L–QIAIF regime to give the same tax benefits as Section 110 SPVs but without having to file public accounts. In June 2018, the Central Bank reported that €55 billion of U.S.–owned distressed Irish assets, equivalent to 25% of Irish GNI*, moved out of Irish Section 110 SPVs and into L–QIAIFs.

==== Green Jersey BEPS tool ====
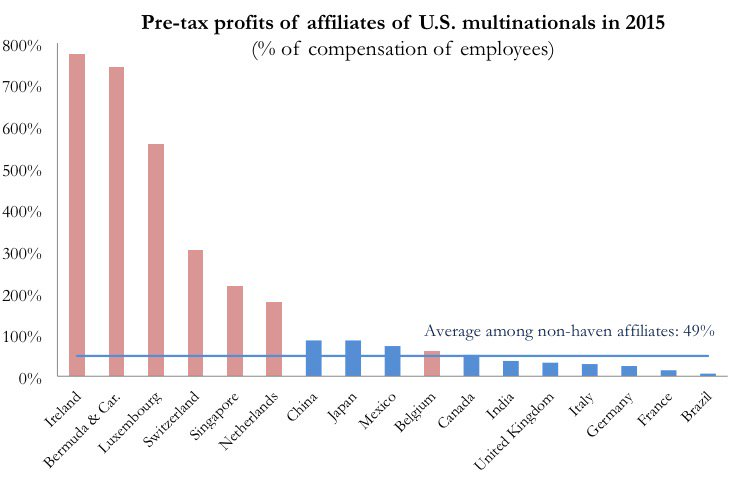
Profitability of U.S. subsidiaries (2015 BEA data)

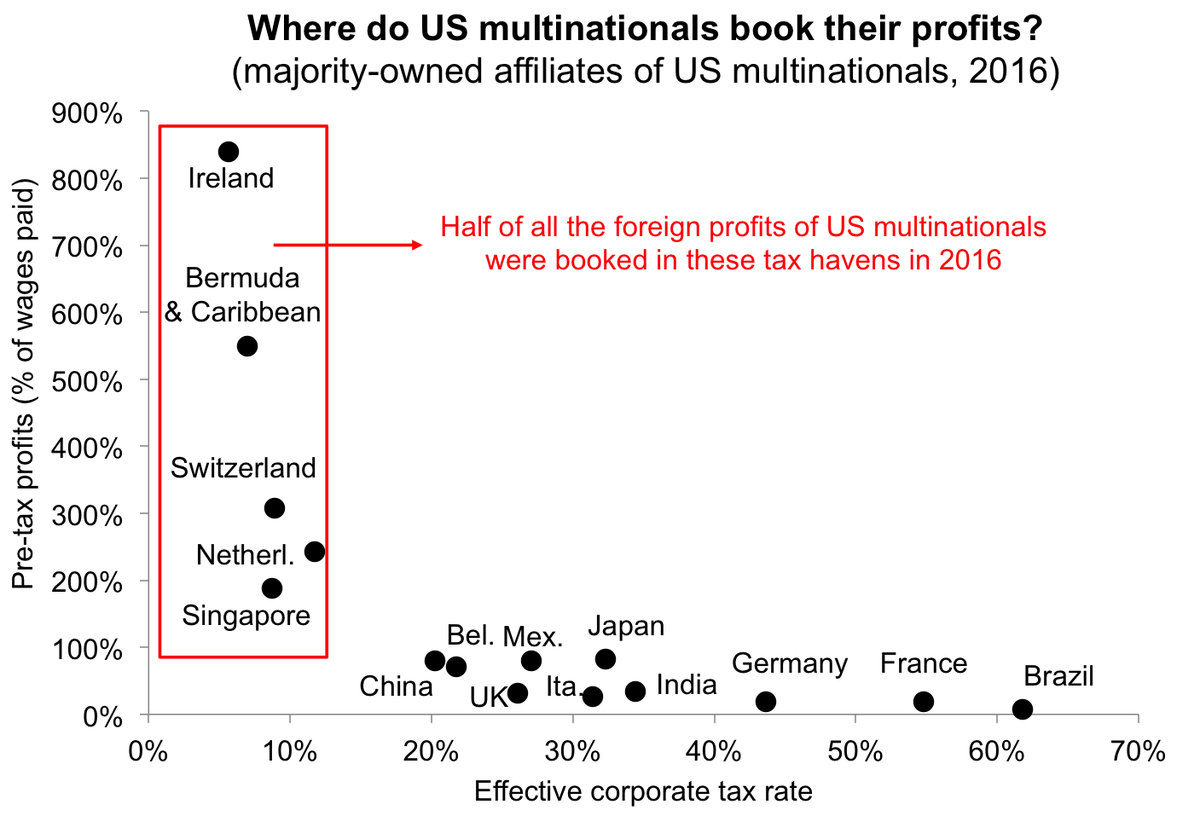
U.S. multinationals book over half of their non–U.S. profits in tax havens by using BEPS tools (2016 BEA).

Apple's Q1 2015 Irish restructure, post their €13 billion EU tax fine for 2004–2014, is one of the most advanced OECD-compliant BEPS tools in the world. It integrates Irish IP–based BEPS tools, and Jersey Debt–based BEPS tools, to materially amplify the tax sheltering effects, by a factor of circa 2. Apple Ireland bought circa $300 billion of a "virtual" IP–asset from Apple Jersey in Q1 2015 (see leprechaun economics). The Irish "capital allowances for intangible assets" ("CAIA") BEPS tool allows Apple Ireland to write-off this virtual IP–asset against future Irish corporation tax. The €26.220 billion jump in intangible capital allowances claimed in 2015, showed Apple Ireland is writing-off this IP–asset over a 10-year period. In addition, Apple Jersey gave Apple Ireland the $300 billion "virtual" loan to buy this virtual IP–asset from Apple Jersey. Thus, Apple Ireland can claim additional Irish corporation tax relief on this loan interest, which is circa $20 billion per annum (Apple Jersey pays no tax on the loan interest it receives from Apple Ireland). These tools, created entirely from virtual internal assets financed by virtual internal loans, give Apple circa €45 billion per annum in relief against Irish corporation tax. In June 2018 it was shown that Microsoft is preparing to copy this Apple scheme, known as "the Green Jersey".

As the IP is a virtual internal asset, it can be replenished with each technology (or life sciences) product cycle (e.g. new virtual IP assets created offshore and then bought by the Irish subsidiary, with internal virtual loans, for higher prices). The Green Jersey thus gives a perpetual BEPS tool, like the double Irish, but at a much greater scale than the double Irish, as the full BEPS effect is capitalised on day one.

Experts expect the U.S. Tax Cuts and Jobs Act of 2017 ("TCJA") GILTI-regime to neutralise some Irish BEPS tools, including the single malt and the double Irish. Because Irish intangible capital allowances are accepted as U.S. GILTI deductions, the "Green Jersey" now enables U.S. multinationals to achieve net effective U.S. corporate tax rates of 0% to 2.5% via TCJA's participation relief. As Microsoft's main Irish BEPS tools are the single malt and the double Irish, in June 2018, Microsoft was preparing a "Green Jersey" Irish BEPS scheme. Irish experts, including Seamus Coffey, Chairman of the Irish Fiscal Advisory Council and author of the Irish State's 2017 Review of Ireland's Corporation Tax Code, expects a boom in U.S. on-shoring of virtual internal IP assets to Ireland, via the Green Jersey BEPS tool (e.g. under the capital allowances for intangible assets scheme).

=== Domestic tax tools ===
Ireland's Qualifying Investor Alternative Investment Fund ("QIAIF") regime is a range of five tax-free legal wrappers (ICAV, Investment Company, Unit Trust, Common Contractual Fund, Investment Limited Partnership). Four of the five wrappers do not file public accounts with the Irish CRO, and therefore offer tax confidentiality and tax secrecy. While they are regulated by the Central Bank of Ireland, like the Section 110 SPV, it has been shown many are effectively unregulated "brass plate" entities. The Central Bank has no mandate to investigate tax avoidance or tax evasion, and under the 1942 Central Bank Secrecy Act, the Central Bank of Ireland cannot send the confidential information which QIAIFs must file with the Bank to the Irish Revenue.

QIAIFs have been used in tax avoidance on Irish assets, on circumventing international regulations, on avoiding tax laws in the EU and the U.S. QIAIFs can be combined with Irish corporate BEPS tools (e.g. the Orphaned Super–QIF), to create routes out of the Irish corporate tax system to Luxembourg, the main Sink OFC for Ireland. It is asserted that a material amount of assets in Irish QIAIFs, and the ICAV wrapper in particular, are Irish assets being shielded from Irish taxation. Offshore magic circle law firms (e.g. Walkers and Maples and Calder, who have set up offices in Ireland), market the Irish ICAV as a superior wrapper to the Cayman SPC (Maples and Calder claim to be a major architect of the ICAV), and there are explicit QIAIF rules to help with re-domiciling of Cayman/BVI funds into Irish ICAVs.

=== Captured state ===
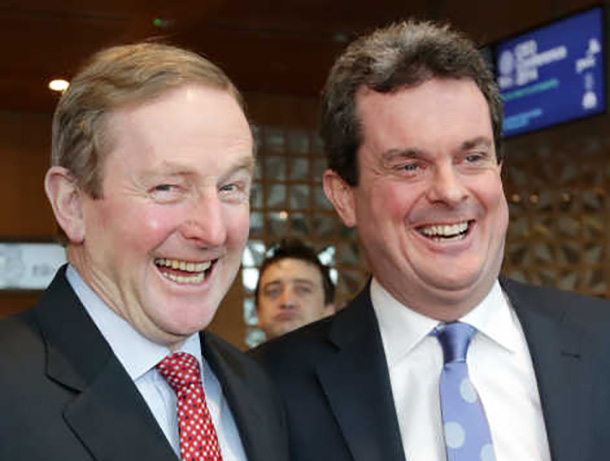
Irish Taoiseach Enda Kenny (l) PwC (Ireland) Managing Partner Feargal O'Rourke (r), architect of the double Irish BEPS tool

There is evidence Ireland meets the captured state criteria for tax havens. When the EU investigated Apple in Ireland in 2016 they found private tax rulings from the Irish Revenue giving Apple a tax rate of 0.005% on over EUR€110 billion of cumulative Irish profits from 2004 to 2014.

When the Irish Finance Minister Michael Noonan was alerted by an Irish MEP in 2016 to a new Irish BEPS tool to replace the Double Irish (called the Single Malt), he was told to "put on the green jersey". When Apple executed the largest BEPS transaction in history in Q1 2015, the Central Statistics Office suppressed data to hide Apple's identity.

Noonan changed the capital allowances for intangible assets scheme rules, the IP–based BEPS tool Apple used in Q1 2015, to reduce Apple's effective tax rate from 2.5% to 0%. When it was discovered in 2016 that U.S. distressed debt funds abused Section 110 SPVs to shield €80 billion in Irish loan balances from Irish taxes, the Irish State did not investigate or prosecute (see Section 110 abuse). In February 2018, the Central Bank of Ireland, which regulates Section 110 SPVs, upgraded the little used tax-free L-QIAIF regime, which has stronger privacy from public scrutiny. In June 2018, U.S. distressed debt funds transferred €55 billion of Irish assets (or 25% of Irish GNI*), out of Section 110 SPVs and into L–QIAIFs.

The June 2017 OECD Anti-BEPS MLI was signed by 70 jurisdictions. The corporate tax havens, including Ireland, opted out of the key Article 12.

Global legal firm Baker McKenzie, representing a coalition of 24 multinational U.S. software firms, including Microsoft, lobbied Michael Noonan, as [Irish] minister for finance, to resist the [OECD MLI] proposals in January 2017. In a letter to him the group recommended Ireland not adopt article 12, as the changes "will have effects lasting decades" and could "hamper global investment and growth due to uncertainty around taxation". The letter said that "keeping the current standard will make Ireland a more attractive location for a regional headquarters by reducing the level of uncertainty in the tax relationship with Ireland's trading partners".

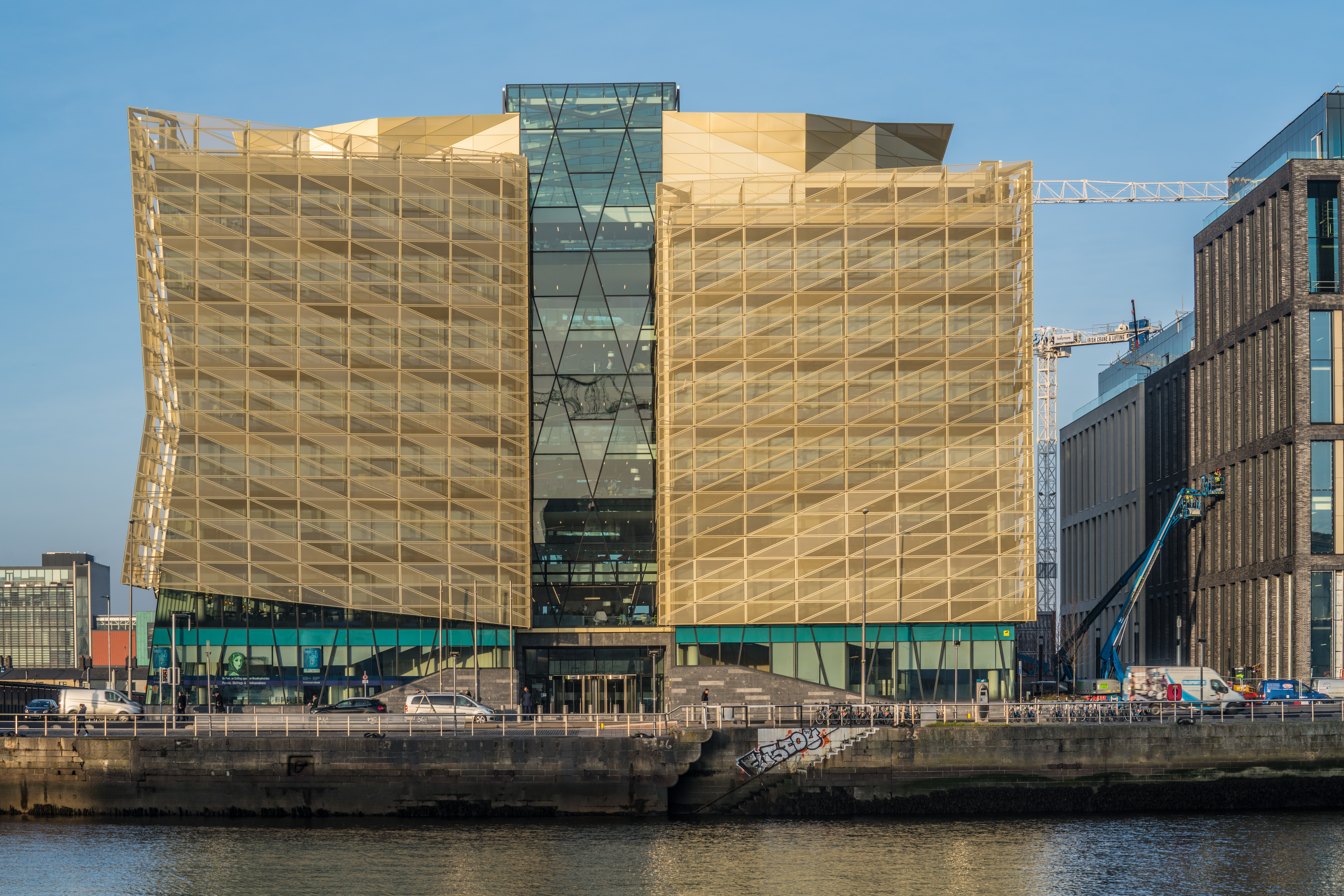
Central Bank of Ireland ("CBI") regulates QIAIFs. When Irish public tax scandals concerning the Section 110 SPV, also regulated by the CBI, emerged in 2016, the CBI upgraded the little–used LQIAIF, to give the same benefits as Section 110 SPVs, but with confidentiality and tax secrecy.

Tax haven investigator Nicholas Shaxson documented how Ireland's captured state uses a complex and "siloed" network of Irish privacy and data protection laws to navigate around the fact that its tax tools are OECD–whitelisted, and therefore must be transparent to some State entity. For example, Irish tax-free QIAIFs (and L–QIAIFs) are regulated by the Central Bank of Ireland and must provide the Bank with details of their financials. However, the 1942 Central Bank Secrecy Act prevents the Central Bank from sending this data to the Revenue Commissioners. Similarly, the Central Statistics Office (Ireland) stated it had to restrict its public data release in 2016–17 to protect Apple's identity during its 2015 BEPS action, because the 1993 Central Statistics Act prohibits use of economic data for revealing such activities. When the EU Commission fined Apple €13 billion for illegal State aid in 2016, there were no official records of any discussion of the tax deal given to Apple outside of the Irish Revenue Commissioners as such data is also protected.

When Tim Cook stated in 2016 that Apple was the largest tax-payer in Ireland, the Irish Revenue Commissioners quoted Section 815A of the 1997 Tax Acts that prevents them disclosing such information, even to members of Dáil Éireann, or the Irish Department of Finance (despite the fact that Apple is circa one-fifth of Ireland's GDP).

Commentators note the plausible deniability provided by Irish privacy and data protection laws, that enable the State to function as a tax haven while maintaining OECD compliance. They ensure the State entity regulating each tax tool are "siloed" from the Irish Revenue, and public scrutiny via FOI laws.

In February 2019, The Guardian reported on leaked Facebook internal reports revealing the influence Facebook had on the Irish State, to which Cambridge University academic John Naughton stated: "the leak was "explosive" in the way it revealed the "vassalage" of the Irish state to the big tech companies". In April 2019, Politico reported on concerns that Ireland was protecting Facebook and Google from the new EU GDPR regulations, stating: "Despite its vows to beef up its threadbare regulatory apparatus, Ireland has a long history of catering to the very companies it is supposed to oversee, having wooed top Silicon Valley firms to the Emerald Isle with promises of low taxes, open access to top officials, and help securing funds to build glittering new headquarters."

=== US multinational companies in Ireland ===
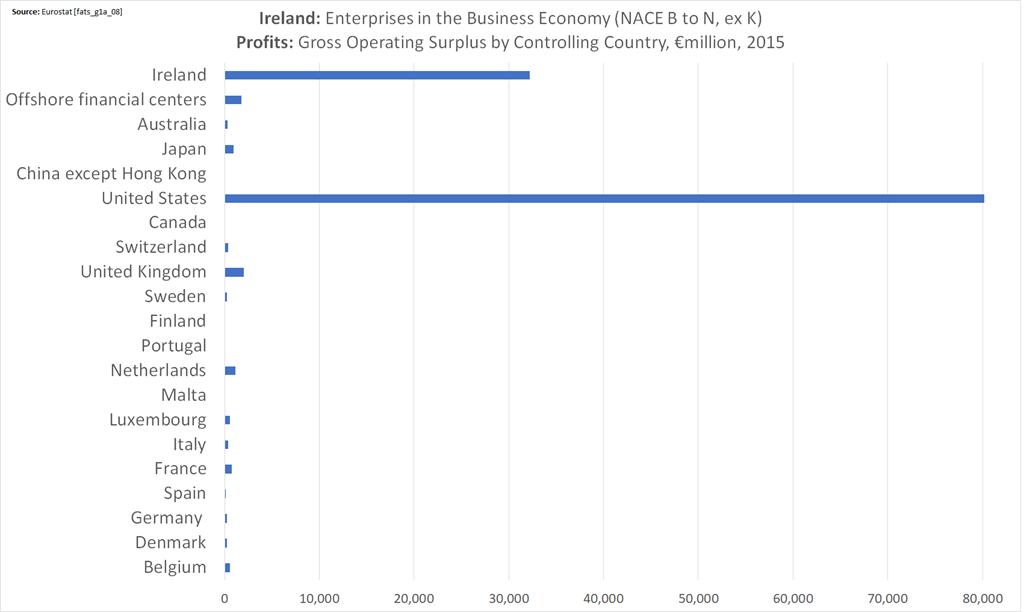
Dominance of US companies: Irish corporate Gross Operating Surplus (i.e. profits), by the controlling country of the company (note: a material part of the Irish figure is also from US tax inversions that are US–controlled). Eurostat (2015).

American multinationals play a substantial role in Ireland's economy, attracted by Ireland's BEPS tools, that shield their non–US profits from the historical US "worldwide" corporate tax system. In contrast, multinationals from countries with "territorial" tax systems, by far the most common corporate tax system in the world, do not need to use corporate–tax havens such as Ireland, as their foreign income is taxed at much lower rates.

For example, in 2016–17, US–controlled multinationals in Ireland:

- Directly employed one–quarter of the Irish private sector workforce;
- Created "higher-value" jobs at an average wage of €85k (€17.9 billion wage roll for 210,443 staff) vs. Irish domestic industrial wage of €35k;
- Paid €28.3 billion in 2016 in taxes (€5.5 billion), wages (€17.9 billion on 210,443 staff) and capital spending (€4.9 billion);
- Paid 80 per cent of Irish corporation and business taxes, which totalled just over €8 billion;
- Paid circa 50 per cent of Irish salary taxes (due to higher paying jobs), 50 per cent of Irish VAT, and 92 per cent of Irish customs and excise duties;
  (this was claimed by a leading Irish tax expert (and Past President of the Irish Tax Institute), but is not fully verifiable)
- Created 57 per cent of private sector non-farm value-add (40% of value-add in Irish services and 80% of value-add in Irish manufacturing);
- Made up 25 of the top 50 Irish companies, by 2017 turnover (see Table 2, below); the only non–U.S/non–Irish other companies are UK companies which either sell into Ireland, like Tesco, or date from pre–2009, when the UK reformed its corporate tax system to a "territorial" regime.
- American–Ireland Chamber of Commerce estimated the value of US investment in Ireland in 2018 was €334 billion, exceeding Irish GDP (€291 billion in 2016).

TABLE 2: Top 50 companies in Ireland by 2017 revenue booked in Ireland (€ billions)List omits foreign companies that file very limited Irish accounts (e.g. Accenture)
Rank (By Revenue)	Company Name	Operational Base	Sector (if non–IRL)	Inversion (if non–IRL)	Revenue (€2017 bn)
1	Apple Ireland	United States	technology	not inversion	119.2
2	CRH plc	Ireland	–	–	27.6
3	Medtronic plc	United States	life sciences	2015 inversion	26.6
4	Google	United States	technology	not inversion	26.3
5	Microsoft	United States	technology	not inversion	18.5
6	Eaton	United States	industrial	2012 inversion	16.5
7	DCC plc	Ireland	–	–	13.9
8	Allergan Inc	United States	life sciences	2013 inversion	12.9
9	Facebook	United States	technology	not inversion	12.6
10	Shire	United Kingdom	life sciences	2008 inversion	12.4
11	Ingersoll-Rand	United States	industrial	2009 inversion	11.5
12	Dell Ireland	United States	technology	not inversion	10.3
13	Oracle	United States	technology	not inversion	8.8
14	Smurfit Kappa Group	Ireland	–	–	8.6
15	Ardagh Glass	Ireland	–	–	7.6
16	Pfizer	United States	life sciences	not inversion	7.5
17	Ryanair	Ireland	–	–	6.6
18	Kerry Group	Ireland	–	–	6.4
19	Merck & Co	United States	life sciences	not inversion	6.1
20	Sandisk	United States	technology	not inversion	5.6
21	Boston Scientific	United States	life sciences	not inversion	5.0
22	Penneys Ireland	Ireland	–	–	4.4
23	Total Produce	Ireland	–	–	4.3
24	Perrigo	United States	life sciences	2013 inversion	4.1
25	Experian	United Kingdom	technology	2006 inversion	3.9
26	Musgrave Group	Ireland	–	–	3.7
27	Kingspan Group	Ireland	–	–	3.7
28	Dunnes Stores	Ireland	–	–	3.6
29	Mallinckrodt Pharma	United States	life sciences	2013 inversion	3.3
30	ESB Group	Ireland	–	–	3.2
31	Alexion Pharma	United States	life sciences	not inversion	3.2
32	Grafton Group	Ireland	–	–	3.1
33	VMware	United States	technology	not inversion	2.9
34	Abbott Laboratories	United States	life sciences	not inversion	2.9
35	ABP Food Group	Ireland	–	–	2.8
36	Kingston Technology	United States	technology	not inversion	2.7
37	Greencore	Ireland	–	–	2.6
38	Circle K Ireland	Ireland	–	–	2.6
39	Tesco Ireland	United Kingdom	food retail	not inversion	2.6
40	McKesson	United States	life sciences	not inversion	2.6
41	Peninsula Petroleum	Ireland	–	–	2.5
42	Glanbia plc	Ireland	–	–	2.4
43	Intel Ireland	United States	technology	not inversion	2.3
44	Gilead Sciences	United States	life sciences	not inversion	2.3
45	Adobe	United States	technology	not inversion	2.1
46	CMC Limited	Ireland	–	–	2.1
47	Ornua Dairy	Ireland	–	–	2.1
48	Baxter	United States	life sciences	not inversion	2.0
49	Paddy Power	Ireland	–	–	2.0
50	ICON Plc	Ireland	–	–	1.9
Total					454.4

From the above table:

1. US–controlled firms are 25 of the top 50 and represent €317.8 billion of the €454.4 billion in total 2017 revenue (or 70%);
2. Apple alone is over 26% of the total top 50 revenue and greater than all top 50 Irish companies combined (see leprechaun economics on Apple as one-fifth of Irish GDP);
3. UK–controlled firms are 3 of the top 50 and represent €18.9 billion of the €454.4 billion in total 2017 revenue (or 4%); Shire and Experian are pre the UK transformation to a "territorial" model;
4. Irish–controlled firms are 22 of the top 50 and represent €117.7 billion of the €454.4 billion in total 2017 revenue (or 26%);
5. There are no other firms in the top 50 Irish companies from other jurisdictions.

== Rebuttals ==
=== Effective tax rates ===
The Irish State refutes tax haven labels as unfair criticism of its low, but legitimate, 12.5% Irish corporate tax rate, which it defends as being the effective tax rate ("ETR"). Independent studies show that Ireland's aggregate effective corporate tax rate is between 2.2% to 4.5% (depending on assumptions made). This lower aggregate effective tax rate is consistent with the individual effective tax rates of U.S. multinationals in Ireland (U.S.–controlled multinationals are 14 of Ireland's largest 20 companies, and Apple alone is over one-fifth of Irish GDP; see "low tax economy"), as well as the IP–based BEPS tools openly marketed by the main tax-law firms in the Irish International Financial Services Centre with ETRs of 0–2.5% (see "effective tax rate").

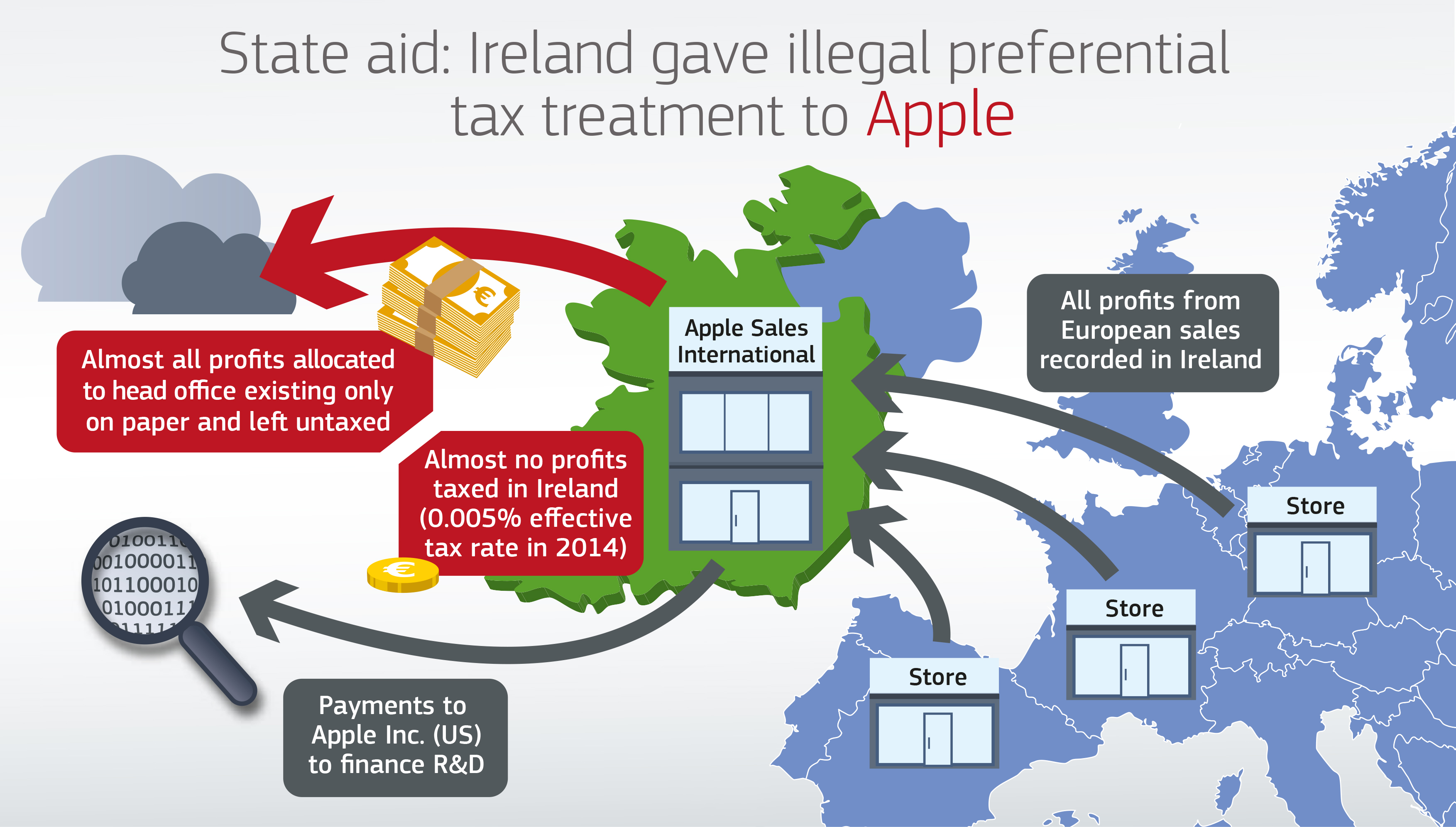
EU Commission's outline of Apple's hybrid–double Irish BEPS tax structure in Ireland that used two branches inside a single company based on private rulings from the Irish Revenue Commissioners in 1991 and 2007

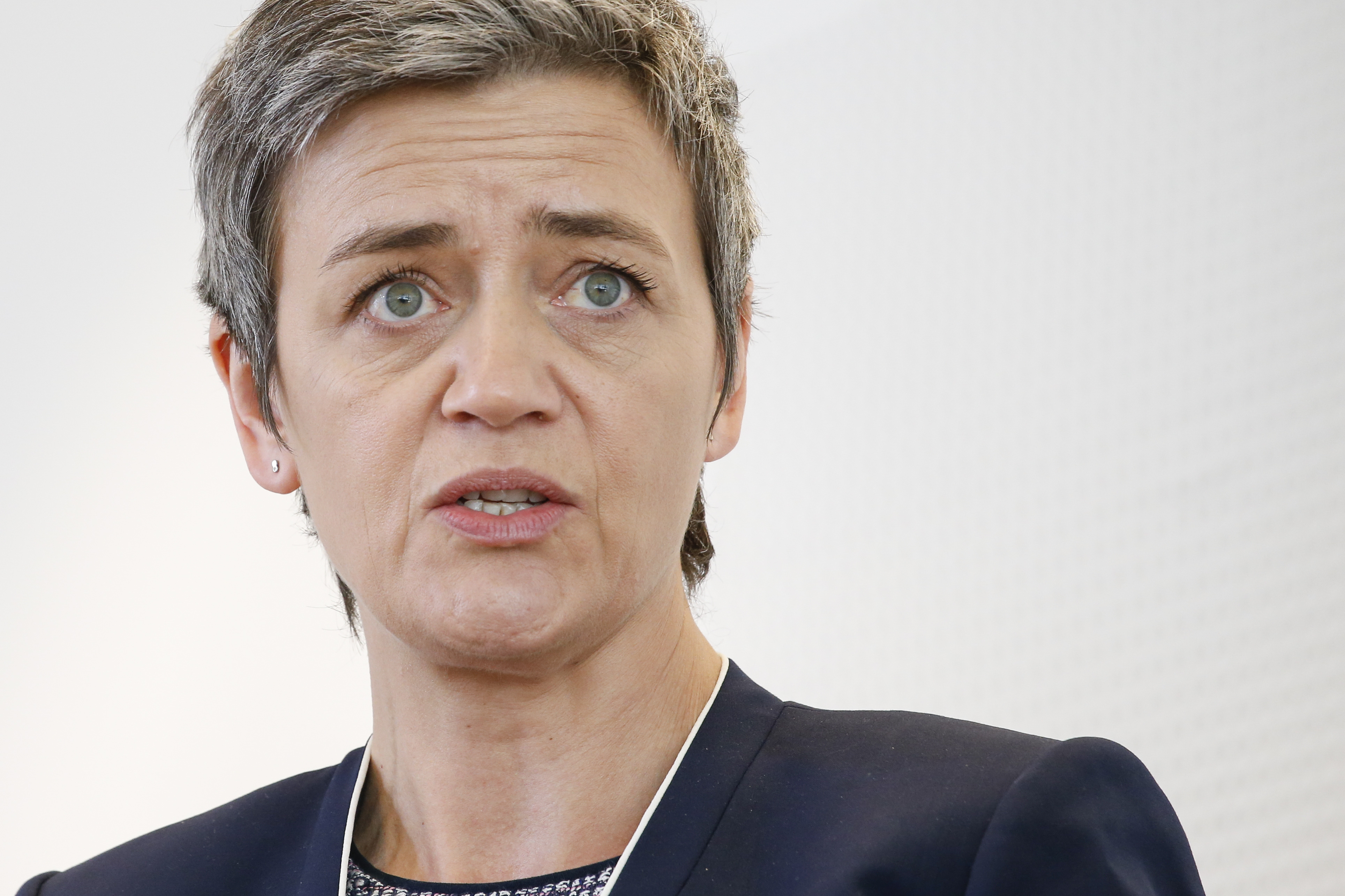
Margrethe Vestager, European Commissioner for Competition, who led case SA:38373 on illegal State aid to Apple in Ireland (2004–2014)

Two of the world's main § Leaders in tax haven research, estimated Ireland's effective corporate tax rate to be 4%: James R. Hines Jr. in his 1994 Hines–Rice paper on tax havens, estimated Ireland's effective corporate rate was 4% (Appendix 4); Gabriel Zucman, 24 years later, in his June 2018 paper on corporate tax havens, also estimated Ireland's effective corporate tax to be 4% (Appendix 1).

The disconnect between the ETR of 12.5% claimed by the Irish State and its advisors, and the actual ETRs of 2.2–4.5% calculated by independent experts, is because the Irish tax code considers a high percentage of Irish income as not being subject to Irish taxation, due to various exclusions and deductions. The gap of 12.5% vs. 2.2–4.5% implies that well over two-thirds of corporate profits booked in Ireland are excluded from Irish corporate taxation (see Irish ETR).

This selective treatment allowed Apple to pay an effective corporate tax rate of 1 per cent on its European profits in 2003 down to 0.005 per cent in 2014.

— Margrethe Vestager, "State aid (SA.38373): Ireland gave illegal tax benefits to Apple worth up to €13 billion" (30 August 2016)

Applying a 12.5% rate in a tax code that shields most corporate profits from taxation, is indistinguishable from applying a near 0% rate in a normal tax code.

— Jonathan Weil, Bloomberg View (11 February 2014)

The Irish State does not refer to QIAIFs (or L–QIAIFs), or Section 110 SPVs, which allow non-resident investors to hold Irish assets indefinitely without incurring Irish taxes, VAT or duties (e.g. permanent "base erosion" to the Irish exchequer as QIAIF units and SPV shares can be traded), and which can be combined with Irish BEPS tools to avoid all Irish corporate taxation (see § Domestic tax tools).

Salary taxes, VAT, and CGT for Irish residents are in line with rates of other EU–28 countries, and tend to be slightly higher than EU–28 averages in many cases. Because of this, Ireland has a special lower salary tax rate scheme, and other tax bonuses, for employees of foreign multinationals earning over €75,000 ("SARP").

The OECD's "Hierarchy of Taxes" pyramid (from the Department of Finance Tax Strategy Group's 2011 tax policy document) summarises Ireland's tax strategy.

=== OECD 1998 definition ===
EU and U.S. studies that attempted to find a consensus on the definition of a tax haven, have concluded that there is no consensus (see tax haven definitions).

The Irish State, and its advisors, have refuted the tax haven label by invoking the 1998 OCED definition of a "tax haven" as the consensus definition:

1. No or nominal tax on the relevant income;
2. Lack of effective exchange of information; (with OECD)
3. Lack of transparency; (with OECD)
4. No substantial activities (e.g. tolerance of brass plate companies). ‡

Most Irish BEPS tools and QIAIFs are OECD–whitelisted (and can thus avail of Ireland's 70 bilateral tax treaties), and therefore while Ireland could meet the first OECD test, it fails the second and third OECD tests. The fourth OECD test (‡) was withdrawn by the OECD in 2002 on protest from the U.S., which indicates is a political dimension to the definition. In 2017, only one jurisdiction, Trinidad & Tobago, met the 1998 OECD definition of a tax haven (Trinidad & Tobago is not one of the 35 OECD member countries), and the definition has fallen into disrepute.

Tax haven academic James R. Hines Jr. notes that OECD tax haven lists never include the 35 OECD member countries (Ireland is a founding OECD member). The OECD definition was produced in 1998 as part of the OECD's investigation into Harmful Tax Competition: An Emerging Global Issue. By 2000, when the OECD published their first list of 35 tax havens, it included no OECD member countries as they were now all considered to have engaged in the OECD's Global Forum on Transparency and Exchange of Information for Tax Purposes (see § External links). Because the OECD has never listed any of its 35 members as tax havens, Ireland, Luxembourg, the Netherlands and Switzerland are sometimes referred to as the "OECD tax havens".

Subsequent definitions of tax haven, and/or offshore financial centre/corporate tax haven (see definition of a "tax haven"), focus on effective taxes as the primary requirement, which Ireland would meet, and have entered the general lexicon. The Tax Justice Network, who places Ireland on its tax haven list, split the concept of tax rates from tax transparency by defining a secrecy jurisdiction and creating the Financial Secrecy Index. The OECD has never updated or amended its 1998 definition (apart from dropping the 4th criteria). The Tax Justice Network imply the U.S. may be the reason.

=== EU 2017 tax haven lists ===
While by 2017, the OECD only considered Trinidad and Tobago to be a tax haven, in 2017 the EU produced a list of 17 tax havens, plus another 47 jurisdictions on the "grey list", however, as with the OECD lists above, the EU list did not include any EU-28 jurisdictions. Only one of the EU's 17 blacklisted tax havens, namely Samoa, appeared in the July 2017 Top 20 tax havens list from CORPNET.

The EU Commission was criticised for not including Ireland, Luxembourg, the Netherlands, Malta and Cyprus, and Pierre Moscovici, explicitly stated to an Irish State Oireachtas Finance Committee on 24 January 2017: Ireland is not a tax haven, although he subsequently called Ireland and the Netherlands "tax black holes" on 18 January 2018.

On 27 March 2019, RTÉ News reported that the European Parliament had "overwhelmingly accepted" a new report that likened Ireland to a tax haven.

=== Hines–Rice 1994 definition ===
The first major § Leaders in tax haven research was James R. Hines Jr., who in 1994, published a paper with Eric M Rice, listing 41 tax havens, of which Ireland was one of their major 7 tax havens. The 1994 Hines–Rice paper is recognised as the first important paper on tax havens, and is the most cited paper in the history of research on tax havens. The paper has been cited by all subsequent, most cited, research papers on tax havens, by other § Leaders in tax haven research, including Desai, Dharmapala, Slemrod, and Zucman. Hines expanded his original 1994 list to 45 countries in 2007, and to 52 countries in the Hines 2010 list, and used quantitative techniques to estimate that Ireland was the third largest global tax haven. Other major papers on tax havens by Dharmapala (2008, 2009), and Zucman (2015, 2018), cite the 1994 Hines–Rice paper, but create their own tax haven lists, all of which include Ireland (e.g., the June 2018, Zucman–Tørsløv–Wier 2018 list).

The 1994 Hines–Rice paper was one of the first to use the term "profit shifting". Hines–Rice also introduced the first quantitative tests of a tax haven, which Hines felt were needed as many tax havens had non-trivial "headline" tax rates. These two tests are still the most widely quoted proxy tests for tax havens in the academic literature. The first test, extreme distortion of national accounts by BEPS accounting flows, was used by the IMF in June 2000 when defining offshore financial centres ("OFCs"), a term the IMF used to capture both traditional tax havens and emerging modern corporate tax havens:

1. Distortion of GDP/GNP. BEPS flows inflate the haven's GDP; proxies are GDP-per-capita (Ireland is 3rd), and deviation of GDP/GNI from 1 (Ireland is now 1st).
2. Hyper–profitability of foreign multinationals. Profit shifting inflates profitability in the tax haven; the proxy is the GAAP profits of foreign companies.

The Hines–Rice paper showed that low foreign tax rates [from tax havens] ultimately enhance U.S. tax collections. Hines' insight that the U.S. is the largest beneficiary from tax havens was confirmed by others, and dictated U.S. policy towards tax havens, including the 1996 "check-the-box" (Note: Before 1996, the United States, like other high-income countries, had anti-avoidance rules—known as "controlled foreign corporations" provisions—designed to immediately tax in the United States some foreign income (such as royalties and interest) conducive of profit shifting. In 1996, the IRS issued regulations that enabled U.S. multinationals to avoid some of these rules by electing to treat their foreign subsidiaries as if they were not corporations but disregarded entities for tax purposes. This move is called "checking the box" because that is all that needs to be done on IRS form 8832 to make it work and use Irish BEPS tools on non–U.S. revenues was a compromise to keep U.S. multinationals from leaving the U.S. (page 10.)) rules, and U.S. hostility to OECD attempts in curbing Ireland's BEPS tools. (Note: The U.S. refused to sign the OECD BEPS Multilateral Instrument ("MLI") on 24 November 2016.) Under the 2017 U.S. TCJA, U.S. multinationals paid a 15.5% repatriation tax on the circa $1 trillion in untaxed cash built up in global tax havens from 2004 to 2017. (Note: 2004 was the date of the last tax U.S. corporate tax amnesty where a repatriation tax of 5% was levied on offshore untaxed profits) Had these U.S. multinationals paid foreign taxes, they would have built up sufficient foreign tax credits to avoid paying U.S. taxes. By allowing U.S. multinationals to use global tax havens, the U.S. exchequer received more taxes, at the expense of other countries, as Hines predicted in 1994.

Several of Hines' papers on tax havens, including the calculations of the Hines–Rice 1994 paper, were used in the final report by the U.S. President's Council of Economic Advisors that justified the U.S. Tax Cuts and Jobs Act of 2017, the largest U.S. tax reform in a generation.

The Irish State dismisses academic studies which list Ireland as a tax haven as being "out-of-date", because they cite the 1994 Hines–Rice paper. The Irish State ignores the fact that both Hines, and all the other academics, developed new lists; or that the Hines–Rice 1994 paper is still considered correct (e.g. per the 2017 U.S. TCJA legislation). In 2013, the Department of Finance (Ireland) co-wrote a paper with the Irish Revenue Commissioners, which they had published in the State-sponsored ESRI Quarterly, which found the only sources listing Ireland as a tax haven were: (Note: This paper made several incorrect assertions, including that there had been no development since the original Hines–Rice list of 41 tax havens, and that all subsequent academic papers on tax havens had simply repeated the original Hines–Rice list)

1. "First, because of Ireland's 12.5 percent corporation tax rate"; (see § Effective tax rates)
2. "Second, the role of the International Financial Services Centre in attracting investment to Ireland" (this is effectively also linked to § Effective tax rates);
3. "Third, because of a rather obscure, but nonetheless influential paper by Hines and Rice dating back to 1994."

This 2013 Irish State-written paper then invoked the § OECD 1998 definition of a tax haven, four years younger than Hines–Rice, and since discredited, to show that Ireland was not a tax haven.

The following is from a June 2018 Irish Independent article by the CEO of the key trade body that represents all U.S. multinationals in Ireland on the 1994 Hines–Rice paper:

However, it looks like the 'tax haven' narrative will always be with us – and typically that narrative is based on studies and data of 20 to 30 years' vintage or even older. It's a bit like calling out Ireland today for being homophobic because up to 1993 same-sex activity was criminalised and ignoring the joyous day in May 2015 when Ireland became the first country in the world to introduce marriage equality by popular vote.

— Mark Redmond, President American Chamber of Commerce in Ireland, 21 June 2018

=== Unique talent base ===
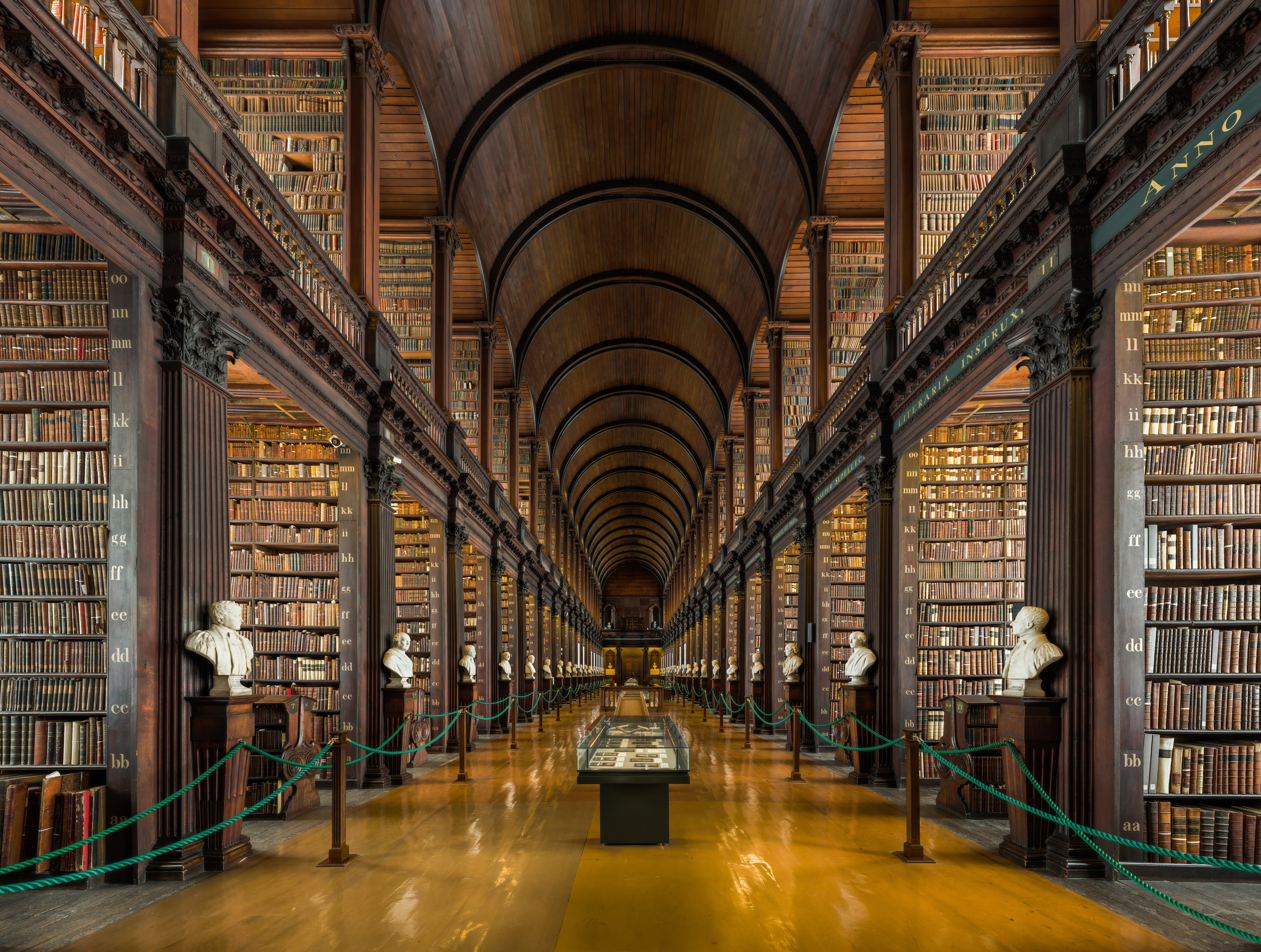
Long Room, Trinity College Dublin ("TCD"). In 2018, TCD lost its place as Ireland's only university in the world's top 100 ranking, falling to 104, but by 2019 had fallen to 120.

In a less technical manner to the rebuttals by the Irish State, the labels have also drawn responses from leaders in the Irish business community who attribute the value of U.S. investment in Ireland to Ireland's unique talent base. At €334 billion, the value of U.S. investment in Ireland is larger than Ireland's 2016 GDP of €291 billion (or 2016 GNI* of €190 billion), and larger than total aggregate U.S. investment into all BRIC countries. This unique talent base is also noted by IDA Ireland, the State body responsible for attracting inward investment, but never defined beyond the broad concept.

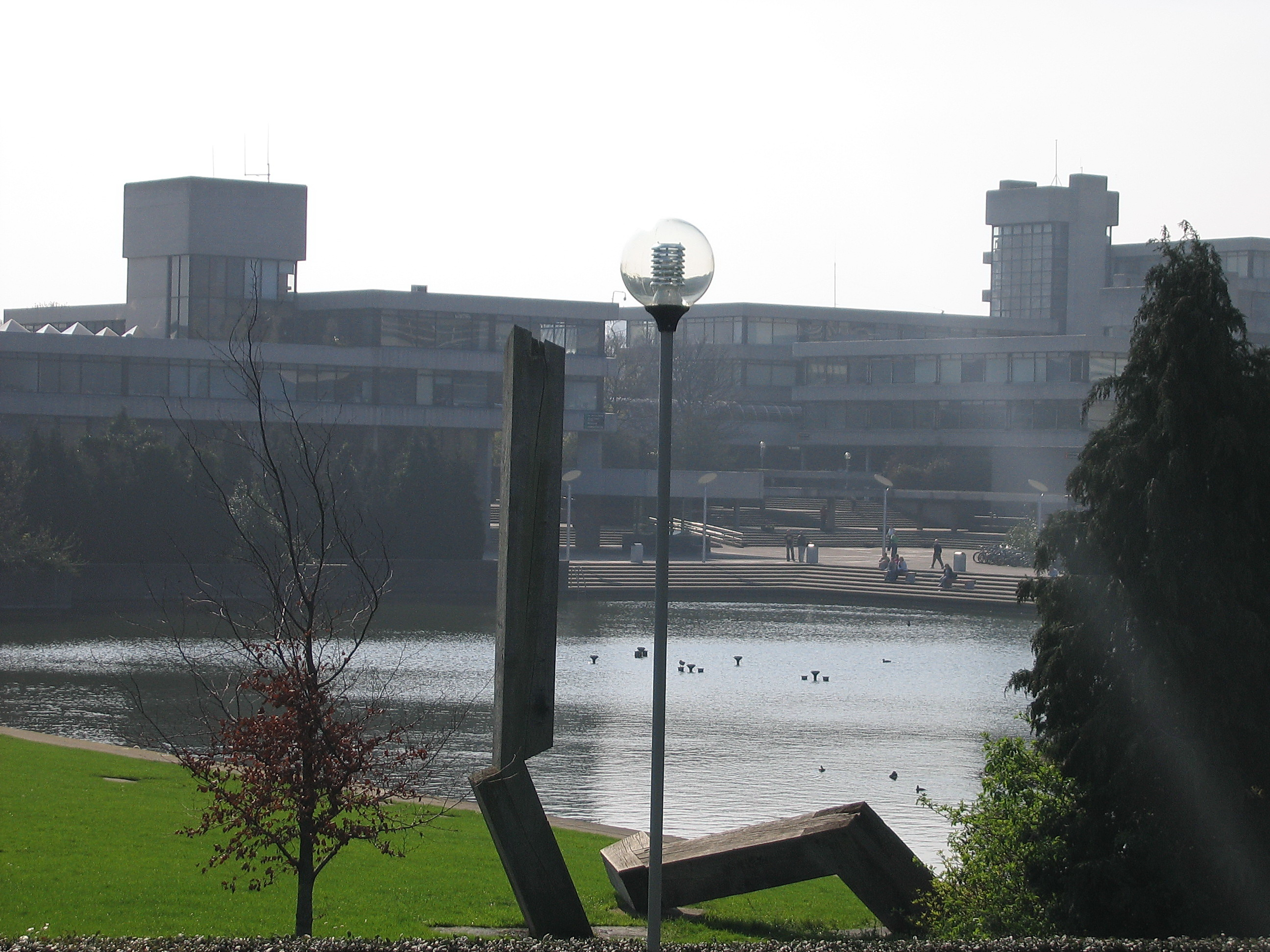
Arts Block, University College Dublin ("UCD"). In 2018, UCD was Ireland's second-ranked university at 193 in the world ranking list, but in 2019 fell to the 201–250 group.

Irish education does not appear to be distinctive. Ireland has a high % of third-level graduates, but this is because it re-classified many technical colleges into degree-issuing institutions in 2005–08. This is believed to have contributed to the decline of its leading universities, of which there are two in the top 200 (i.e. a quality over quantity issue). Ireland continues to pursue this strategy and is considering re-classifying the remaining Irish technical institutes as universities for 2019.

Ireland shows no apparent distinctiveness in any non-tax related metrics of business competitiveness including cost of living, league tables of favoured EU FDI locations, league tables of favoured EU destinations for London-based financials post-Brexit (which are linked to quality of talent), and the key World Economic Forum Global Competitiveness Report rankings.

Without its low-tax regime, Ireland will find it hard to sustain economic momentum

— Ashoka Mody, Ex–IMF mission chief to Ireland, "Warning Ireland faces economic threat over corporate tax reliance – Troika chief", 9 June 2018.

Irish commentators provide a perspective on Ireland's "talent base". The State applies an "employment tax" (Note: Under Section 291A of the 1997 Irish Tax and Consolidated Acts, users of Irish BEPS tools must conduct a "relevant trade" and perform "relevant activities" in Ireland to give the BEPS tool a degree of credibility and substance. In effect, it can equate to an "employment tax" on the Irish subsidiary, however, to the extent that the "relevant activities" are needed within the Group (e.g. they are performing real tasks), then the effect of this "employment tax" is mitigated. While the Irish State has never published the employment metrics for using Irish BEPS tools, the evidence is that even where the "relevant activities" were completely unnecessary, the "employment tax" equates to circa 2–3% of revenues (see here).) to U.S. multinationals using Irish BEPs tools. To fulfil their Irish employment quotas, some U.S. technology firms perform low-grade localisation functions in Ireland which requires foreign employees speaking global languages (while many U.S. multinationals perform higher-value software engineering functions in Ireland, some do not). These employees must be sourced internationally. This is facilitated via a loose Irish work-visa programme. This Irish "employment tax" requirement for use of BEPS tools, and its fulfilment via foreign work-visas, is a driver of Dublin's housing crisis. This is consistent with a bias to property development-led economic growth, favoured by the main Irish political parties (see Abuse of QIAIFs).

=== Global "knowledge hub" for "selling into Europe" ===
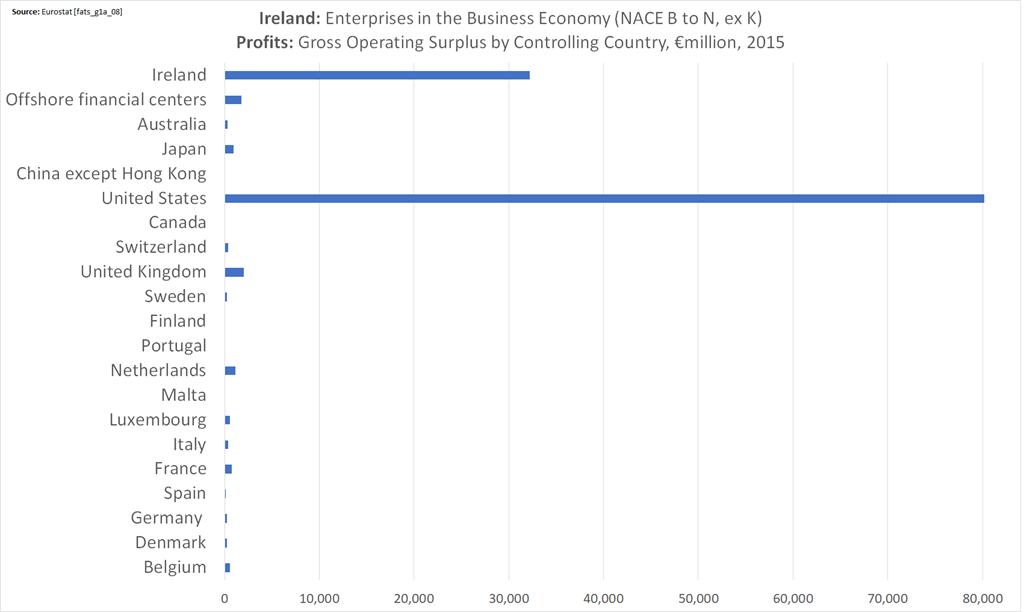
Only U.S. multinationals use Ireland: Irish corporate gross operating surplus by the controlling country of the company (note: a material part of the Irish figure are from U.S. tax inversions who are also U.S.–controlled companies). Eurostat (2015)

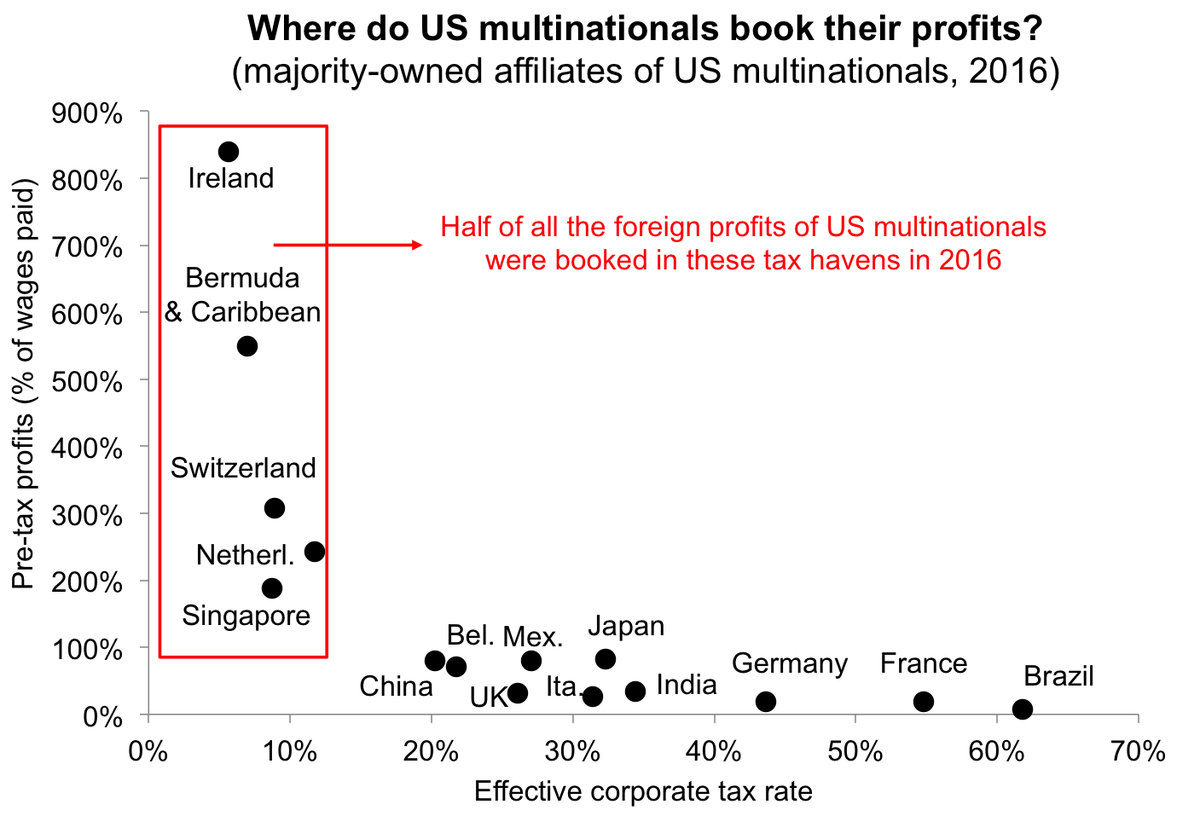
U.S. multinationals book over half of their non–U.S. profits in tax havens by using BEPS tools (2016 BEA).

In another less technical rebuttal, the State explains Ireland's high ranking in the established "proxy tests" for tax havens as a by–product of Ireland's position as preferred hub for global "knowledge economy" multinationals (e.g. technology and life sciences), "selling into EU–28 markets". When the Central Statistics Office (Ireland) suppressed its 2016–2017 data release to protect Apple's Q1 2015 BEPS action, it released a paper on "meeting the challenges of a modern globalised knowledge economy".

Ireland has no foreign corporates that are non–U.S./non–UK in its top 50 companies by revenue, and only one by employees (German Lidl, which sells into Ireland). The UK multinationals in Ireland are either selling into Ireland (e.g. Tesco), or date pre–2009, after which the UK overhauled its tax system to a "territorial tax" model. Since 2009, the U.K has become a major tax haven (see U.K. transformation). Since this transformation, no major UK firms have moved to Ireland and most UK corporate tax inversions to Ireland returned; although Ireland has succeeded in attracting some financial services firms affected by Brexit.

In 2016, U.S. corporate tax expert, James R. Hines Jr., showed multinationals from "territorial" corporate taxation systems don't need tax havens, when researching behaviours of German multinationals with German academic tax experts.

U.S.–controlled multinationals constitute 25 of the top 50 Irish firms (including tax inversions), and 70% of top 50 revenue (see Table 1). U.S.–controlled multinations pay 80% of Irish corporate taxes (see "low tax economy"). Irish–based U.S. multinationals may be selling into Europe, however, the evidence is that they route all non–U.S. business through Ireland. Ireland is more accurately described as a "U.S. corporate tax haven". The U.S. multinationals in Ireland are from "knowledge industries" (see Table 1). This is because Ireland's BEPS tools (e.g. the double Irish, the single malt and the capital allowances for intangible assets) require intellectual property ("IP") to execute the BEPS actions, which technology and life sciences possess in quantity (see IP–Based BEPS tools).

Intellectual property (IP) has become the leading tax-avoidance vehicle.

— UCLA Law Review, "Intellectual Property Law Solutions to Tax Avoidance", (2015)

Rather than a "global knowledge hub" for "selling into Europe", it might be suggested that Ireland is a base for U.S. multinationals with sufficient IP to use Ireland's BEPS tools to shield non–U.S. revenues from U.S. taxation.

No other non-haven OECD country records as high a share of foreign profits booked in tax havens (Note: The paper lists tax havens as: Ireland, Luxembourg, Netherlands, Switzerland, Singapore, Bermuda and Caribbean havens (page 6.)) as the United States. [...] This suggests that half of all the global profits shifted to tax havens are shifted by U.S. multinationals. By contrast, about 25% accrues to E.U. countries, 10% to the rest of the OECD, and 15% to developing countries (Tørsløv et al., 2018).

— Gabriel Zucman, Thomas Wright, "THE EXORBITANT TAX PRIVILEGE", NBER Working Papers (September 2018).

In 2018, the U.S. converted into a hybrid "territorial" tax system (the U.S. was one of the last remaining pure "worldwide" tax systems). Post this conversion, U.S. effective tax rates for IP–heavy U.S. multinationals are very similar to the effective tax rates they would incur if legally headquartered in Ireland, even net of full Irish BEPS tools like the double Irish. This represents a substantive challenge to the Irish economy (see effect of U.S. Tax Cuts and Jobs Act). However, § Technical issues with TCJA mean some Irish BEPS tools, such as Apple's § Green Jersey, have been enhanced.

Ireland's recent expansion into traditional tax haven services (e.g. Cayman Island and Luxembourg type ICAVs and L–QIAIFs) is a diversifier from U.S. corporate tax haven services. Brexit was initially disappointing for Ireland in the area of attracting financial services firms from London, but the situation later improved. Brexit has led to growth in UK centric tax-law firms (including offshore magic circle firms), setting up offices in Ireland to handle traditional tax haven services for clients.

== Countermeasures ==
=== Background ===
==== Apparent contradictions ====
While Ireland's development into traditional tax haven tools (e.g. ICAVs and L–QIAIFs) is more recent, Ireland's status as a corporate tax haven has been noted since 1994 (the first Hines–Rice tax haven paper), and discussed in the U.S. Congress for a decade. A lack of progress, and delays, in addressing Ireland's corporate tax BEPS tools is apparent:

1. Ireland's most famous BEPS tool, the double Irish, attributed to creating the largest build-up in untaxed cash in history, was documented in 2004. The U.S. did not seek its closure, and it was the EU that forced Ireland to close the double Irish BEPS tool in October 2014; however, existing users such as Google and Facebook, were given a five–year delay to January 2020 before closure.
2. Ireland's replacement for the double Irish tool, the single malt, was already up and running in 2014 (and used by Microsoft and Allergan in 2017), and has as yet not received any US–EU–OECD attention. It is noted that since the closure of the double Irish in 2015, the use of Irish BEPS tools increased materially;
3. The OECD, who is running a project since 2012 to stop global BEPS activities, has made no comment on Apple's Q1 2015 USD 300 billion Irish BEPS transaction, the largest BEPS transaction in history (labelled "leprechaun economics" by Nobel Prize economist, Paul Krugman), with Ireland's expanded capital allowances for intangible assets ("CAIA") BEPS tool (the "Green Jersey");
4. The U.S. administration condemned Apple's Irish tax structures in the 2013 Levin–McCain PSI, however, it came to Apple's defense when the EU Commission levied a €13 billion fine on Apple for Irish tax avoidance from 2004 to 2014, the largest corporate tax fine in history, arguing that Apple paying the full 12.5% Irish corporate tax rate would harm the U.S. exchequer;
5. Germany has condemned Ireland for its tax tools, however, Germany blocked the EU Commission's push for country-by-country reporting ("CbCr") which would effectively end EU tax havens, and the German administration neutralised its own Parliament's 2018 "Royalty Barrier" by exempting all OECD–approved IP–schemes (i.e. all of Ireland's BEPS tools), see German Lizenzschranke;
6. Tax haven economist, Gabriel Zucman, showed in 2018 that most corporate tax disputes are between high-tax jurisdictions, and not between high-tax and low-tax corporate tax haven jurisdictions. In fact, Zucman's (et alia) analysis shows that disputes with the major corporate tax havens of Ireland, Luxembourg and the Netherlands, are rare.
  ==== Global Tax Plans ====
 While Ireland has been considered a tax haven by many for decades now, the global tax system that Ireland depends on to incentivize multinational corporations to move there is receiving an overhaul by a coalition of 130 nations. Previously this global tax system did not do much to limit tax dodging by multinational firms, with Ireland’s official corporate tax rate until this rework being at a mere 12.5% alongside a tax regime meant to help global companies based there avoid paying taxes to other countries where they make profits. Originally Ireland was one of the few countries (one out of nine) to oppose the sign on for reform to a global minimum corporate tax rate of 15% and to force technology and retail companies to pay taxes based on where their goods and services were sold, rather than where the company was located. There was obvious hesitation for Irish officials to raise their tax rates while they enjoyed their status of being a tax haven and attracted the business multinational corporations throughout the world, the Irish government would eventually agree to the terms of the deal after some time and debate. As of 7 October 2021 Ireland dropped its opposition to an overhaul of global corporate tax rules giving up its 12.5% tax rate. The Irish Cabinet approved an increase from 12.5% to 15% in corporation tax for companies with turnover in excess of 750 million euros. Additionally, the Irish Department of Finance has estimated that joining this global deal would reduce the country’s tax take by 2 billion euros ($2.3 billion) a year, according to RTE. The other countries as part of this deal did have to agree to compromise on a few key issues involved in the reform, dropping the "at least" in the statement "minimum corporate tax rate of at least 15%” updating it to just 15% — signaling that the rate would not be pushed up at a later date. Ireland was also given assurances that it could keep the lower rate for smaller firms located in the country.

==== Source of contradictions ====
Tax haven experts explain these contradictions as resulting from the different agendas of the major OECD taxing authorities, and particularly the U.S., and Germany, who while not themselves considered tax havens or corporate tax havens, rank #2 and #7 respectively in the 2018 Financial Secrecy Index of tax secrecy jurisdictions:

1. U.S. Perspective I. Pre the Tax Cuts and Jobs Act of 2017 ("TCJA"), the U.S. had one of the highest global rates of corporation tax at 35%. Allowing U.S. multinationals to "check-the-box," the aggregate worldwide tax rates of U.S. multinationals is far lower than 35%. This compromise was not unanimously supported in Washington and some U.S. multinationals still inverted to Ireland. Tax academics have labelled Washington's concession to U.S. multinationals as the exorbitant tax privilege (and link it to the wider economic concept of U.S. exorbitant privilege).
2. U.S. Perspective II. If the U.S. forced U.S. multinationals not to use tax havens, then U.S. multinationals would be forced to pay higher taxes in the global jurisdictions in which they operate. As first shown in the 1994 Hines–Rice paper, the U.S. has long been aware that by allowing U.S. multinationals to use BEPS tools from global corporate tax havens, increases the ultimate taxes received by the U.S. exchequer. The 2017 TCJA U.S. repatriation tax of 15.5% would not have been payable had U.S. multinationals been paying full foreign taxes on their non–U.S. income.
3. EU Perspective I. The EU is the world's largest net exporting bloc. Many EU countries therefore also rely on IP–based BEPS tools to re-charge gross profits from global sales of automobiles, chemicals, and other exports, back to the EU. Because most EU countries run a "territorial" tax system, which allows lower tax rates for foreign sourced income, EU multinationals do not need to use Irish BEPS tools as the U.S. multinationals do; Tax haven expert, James R. Hines Jr., saw this when researching why German multinationals make so little use of tax havens in 2016.
4. EU Perspective II. A second noted EU perspective is that if U.S. multinationals need Ireland as a BEPS hub because the pre–TCJA U.S. "worldwide" tax system did not enable them to charge IP direct from the U.S. (without incurring larger U.S. taxes), then the money Ireland extracts from these U.S. multinationals (e.g. some Irish corporate taxes and Irish salaries), are still a net positive for the aggregate EU–28 economy. Ireland and other so-called "EU tax havens", can extract EU "rents" from U.S. multinationals, which EU multinationals don't have to pay.

=== Tax Cuts and Jobs Act ===
==== Impact ====
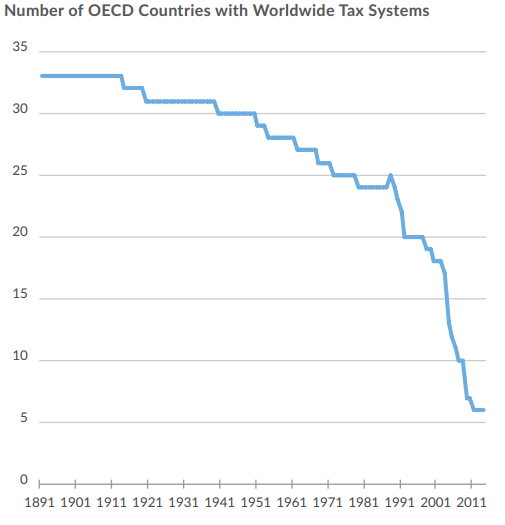
OECD "worldwide tax" countries

Before the passing of the TCJA in December 2017, the U.S. was one of eight remaining jurisdictions to run a "worldwide" taxation system, which was the principal obstacle to U.S. corporate tax reform, as it was not possible to differentiate between the source of income. (Note: Before the passing of the TCJA in December 2017, the U.S. was one of eight remaining jurisdictions to run a "worldwide" taxation system, which was the principal obstacle to U.S. corporate tax reform, as it was not possible to differentiate between the source of income. The seven other "worldwide" tax systems, are: Chile, Greece, Ireland, Israel, Korea, Mexico, and Poland. The positive experience of the UK switch to a "territorial" system in 2009–12, and the Japanese switch to a "territorial" system in 2009, amongst others, was continually highlighted by U.S. tax academics.) The seven other "worldwide" tax systems, are: Chile, Greece, Ireland, Israel, Korea, Mexico, and Poland.

Tax experts expect the anti-BEPS provisions of the TCJA's new hybrid "territorial" taxation system, the GILTI and BEAT tax regimes, to neutralize some Irish BEPS tools (e.g. the double Irish and the single malt). In addition, the TCJA's FDII tax regime makes U.S.–controlled multinationals indifferent as to whether they charge-out their IP from the U.S. or from Ireland, as net effective tax rates on IP, under the FDII and GILTI regimes, are very similar. Post-TCJA, S&P500 IP–heavy U.S.–controlled multinationals, have guided 2019 tax rates that are similar, whether legally headquartered in Ireland or the U.S.

Tax academic, Mihir A. Desai, in a post-TCJA interview in the Harvard Business Review said that: "So, if you think about a lot of technology companies that are housed in Ireland and have massive operations there, they’re not going to maybe need those in the same way, and those can be relocated back to the U.S.

It is expected Washington will be less accommodating to U.S. multinationals using Irish BEPS tools and locating IP in tax havens. The EU Commission has also become less tolerant of U.S. multinational use of Irish BEPS tools, as evidenced by the €13 billion fine on Apple for Irish tax avoidance from 2004 to 2014. There is widespread unhappiness of Irish BEPS tools in Europe, even from other tax havens.

"Now that [U.S.] corporate tax reform has passed, the advantages of being an inverted company are less obvious"

— Jami Rubin, Managing Director and Head of Life Sciences Research Group, Goldman Sachs (March 2018).

==== Technical issues ====
While the Washington and EU political compromises tolerating Ireland as a corporate tax haven may be eroding, tax experts point to various technical flaws in the TCJA which, if not resolved, may actually enhance Ireland as a U.S. corporate tax haven:

1. Acceptance of Irish capital allowance charges in the GILTI calculation. Ireland's most powerful BEPS tool is the capital allowances for intangible assets scheme (i.e Apple's Green Jersey). With TCJA participation relief, U.S. multinationals can now achieve net effective U.S. tax rates of 0% to 2.5% via this Irish BEPS tool. In June 2018, Microsoft prepared a Green Jersey scheme.
2. Tax relief of 10% of Tangible Assets in the GILTI calculation. This incentivizes the development of Irish infrastructure as the Irish tax code doubles this U.S. GILTI relief with Irish tangible capital allowances. Every $100 a U.S. multinational spends on Irish offices reduces their U.S. taxes by $42 ($21 & $21). Google has doubled their Irish hub in 2018.
3. Assessment of GILTI on an aggregate basis rather than a country-by-country basis. Ireland's BEPS schemes generate large tax reliefs that net down the aggregate global income eligible for GILTI assessment, thus reducing TCJA's anti-BEPS protections, and making Ireland's BEPS tools a key part of U.S. multinational post-TCJA tax planning.

A June 2018 IMF country report on Ireland, while noting the significant exposure of Ireland's economy to U.S. corporates, concluded that the TCJA may not be as effective as Washington expects in addressing Ireland as a U.S. corporate tax haven. In writing its report, the IMF conducted confidential anonymous interviews with Irish corporate tax experts.

Some tax experts, noting Google and Microsoft's actions in 2018, assert these flaws in the TCJA are deliberate, and part of the U.S. Administration's original strategy to reduce aggregate effective global tax rates for U.S. multinationals to circa 10–15% (i.e. 21% on U.S. income, and 2.5% on non–U.S. income, via Irish BEPS tools). There has been an increase in U.S. multinational use of Irish intangible capital allowances, and some tax experts believe that the next few years will see a boom in U.S. multinationals using the Irish "Green Jersey" BEPS tool and on-shoring their IP to Ireland (rather than the U.S.).

As discussed in § Hines–Rice 1994 definition and § Source of contradictions, the U.S. Treasury's corporation tax policy seeks to maximise long-term U.S. taxes paid by using corporate tax havens to minimise near-term foreign taxes paid. In this regard, it is possible that Ireland still has a long-term future as a U.S. corporate tax haven.

It is undoubtedly true that some American business operations are drawn offshore by the lure of low tax rates in tax havens; nevertheless, the policies of tax havens may, on net, enhance the U.S. Treasury's ability to collect tax revenue from American corporations.

— James R. Hines Jr. & Eric M Rice, Fiscal Paradise: Foreign tax havens and American business, 1994.

In February 2019, Brad Setser from the Council on Foreign Relations, wrote a The New York Times article highlighting material issues with TCJA.

== See also ==
- Criticism of Google
- Criticism of Apple Inc.
- Criticism of Facebook
- Criticism of Microsoft
- Corporation tax in the Republic of Ireland
- Qualifying investor alternative investment fund (QIAIF) Irish tax-free vehicles
- Single malt arrangement IP-based BEPS tool
- Panama as a tax haven
- United States as a tax haven

== Sources ==
=== Journals ===
The following are the most cited papers on "tax havens", as ranked on the IDEAS/RePEc database of economic papers, at the Federal Reserve Bank of St. Louis.

Papers marked with (‡) were also cited by the EU Commission's 2017 summary as the most important research on tax havens.

Papers highlighted explicitly label Ireland a tax haven (either by including Ireland in a table of "tax havens", or stating directly that Ireland is a "tax haven").

Papers on tax havens, ranked by academic citations, over the last 25 years.
Rank	Paper	Journal	Vol-Issue-Page	Author(s)	Year
1‡	Fiscal Paradise: Foreign tax havens and American Business	Quarterly Journal of Economics	109 (1) 149–182	James R. Hines Jr., Eric M. Rice	1994
2‡	The demand for tax haven operations	Journal of Public Economics	90 (3) 513–531	Mihir A. Desai, C Fritz Foley, James R. Hines Jr.	2006
3‡	Which countries become tax havens?	Journal of Public Economics	93 (9–10) 1058–1068	Dhammika Dharmapala, James Hines	2009
4‡	The Missing Wealth of Nations: Are Europe and the U.S. net Debtors or net Creditors?	Quarterly Journal of Economics	128 (3) 1321–1364	Gabriel Zucman	2013
5‡	Tax competition with parasitic tax havens	Journal of Public Economics	93 (11–12) 1261–1270	Joel Slemrod, John D. Wilson	2006
6	What problems and opportunities are created by tax havens?	Oxford Review of Economic Policy	24 (4) 661–679	Dhammika Dharmapala, James Hines	2008
7	In praise of tax havens: International tax planning (The paper does not explicitly list/reference any country as a tax haven)	European Economic Review	54 (1) 82–95	Qing Hong, Michael Smart	2010
8‡	End of bank secrecy: Evaluation of G20 tax haven crackdown (Zucman does not explicitly label Ireland a tax haven as he does in other papers)	American Economic Journal	6 (1) 65–91	Niels Johannesen, Gabriel Zucman	2014
9‡	Taxing across borders: Tracking wealth and corporate profits	Journal of Economic Perspectives	28 (4) 121–148	Gabriel Zucman	2014
10‡	Treasure Islands	Journal of Economic Perspectives	24 (4) 103–26	James R. Hines Jr.	2010

=== Books ===
(with at least 300 citations on Google Scholar)

- Ronen Palan; Richard Murphy; Christian Chavagneux (2009). Tax Havens: How Globalization Really Works. Cornell University Press. ISBN 978-0-8014-7612-9.
- Nicholas Shaxson (2011). Treasure Islands: Uncovering the Damage of Offshore Banking and Tax Havens. Palgrave Macmillan. ISBN 978-0-230-10501-0.
- Jane G. Gravelle (2015). Tax Havens: International Tax Avoidance and Evasion (PDF). Congressional Research Service. ISBN 978-1482527681.
- Gabriel Zucman (2016). The Hidden Wealth of Nations: The Scourge of Tax Havens. University of Chicago Press. ISBN 978-0226422640.
