= Jonathan Weil =

American journalist

Jonathan Weil is an American journalist, analyst and attorney. Born July 20, 1970, he grew up in Hollywood, Florida, and attended Pine Crest School in Fort Lauderdale. He earned a bachelor's degree in journalism from the University of Colorado at Boulder in 1991 and a juris doctor degree from Southern Methodist University in 1995.

== Biography ==
Weil was a columnist for Bloomberg News and Bloomberg View from 2007 to 2014. He was managing director and editor of financial research at Glass Lewis & Co. (2006–2007), an investment-research and proxy-advisory firm in Broomfield, Colorado. Before that, he was a reporter for The Wall Street Journal (1997–2005; 2022–present), where he wrote about accounting and finance. He began his career as a reporter at the Arkansas Democrat-Gazette (1995–1997).

Weil was a Gerald Loeb Award finalist in 2002 and won the New York State Society of Certified Public Accountants Excellence in Financial Journalism Award in 2008, 2009, 2010, and 2011. He won Society of American Business Editors and Writers Best in Business Journalism Awards in 2009, and 2010. He also won The Society of the Silurians Award for Editorial Writing/Commentary in 2011.

Weil has been credited by Columbia Journalism Review, Barron's and The New Yorker magazine, among others, as the first reporter to challenge Enron's accounting practices during the Internet bubble, for his Sept. 20, 2000, WSJ article, "Energy Traders Cite Gains, But Some Math Is Missing". His columns for Bloomberg in 2007 and 2008 focused on questionable accounting practices at Fannie Mae, Freddie Mac, Wachovia, Washington Mutual, Lehman Brothers, AIG, Citigroup, and IndyMac.

== Awards and honors ==
- 2010 American Business Editors and Writers Best in Business Journalism Awards
- 2009 American Business Editors and Writers Best in Business Journalism Awards
- 2011 Society of the Silurians Award for Editorial Writing/Commentary

== Sources ==
- Audit Interview: Jonathan Weil
- Jonathan Weil On GoldmanGate
- Prepared Witness Testimony Full Committee on Energy and Commerce
- "Try to Go Beyond Accuracy"
- "Open Secrets"
- "Open Secrets"
- "Author Malcolm Gladwell"
- "Inside The Fall Of Enron"
- "The Claim Game"
- "CSI: Denver"
- "Energy Traders Cite Gains
- "Paper Tiger"
- "A Pox on Both Your Houses..."
- "The Role of Financial Journalists..."

== See also ==
- Tax haven
- Ireland as a tax haven
