= Nicholas Shaxson =

British writer

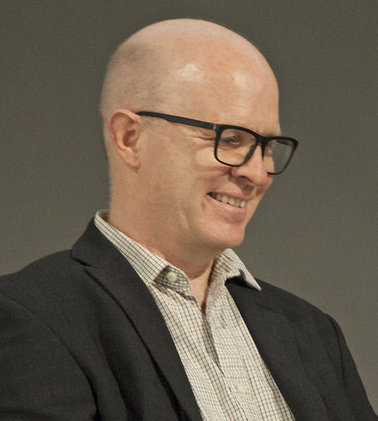
- Nicholas Shaxson at the Disruption Network Lab in 2019
- Born: 1966 (age 59–60); Malawi
- Occupation: Author
- Writing career
- Notable works: Poisoned Wells, Treasure Islands, The Finance Curse

Nicholas Shaxson (born 1966) is a British author, journalist, investigator and social entrepreneur. He is best known for his investigative books Poisoned Wells (2007, about oil and politics in west Africa), Treasure Islands (2011, about tax havens), and The Finance Curse (2018, about the perils of oversized financial sectors.) His books have been translated into 12 languages. He is also a Technology and Human Rights Fellow at the Carr Center for Human Rights Policy Harvard Kennedy School for 2025-26.

== Biography ==
Shaxson was born in Malawi and educated in Britain. He has lived at various times in India, Brazil, England, Lesotho, Spain, Angola, South Africa, Germany, Switzerland, and the Netherlands. Since 1993, he has written on global business and politics for The Financial Times, The Guardian, Vanity Fair, the Economist Intelligence Unit, Foreign Affairs, The Nation, American Interest, and others.

Shaxson first began working for the Tax Justice Network in 2006. His first book was Poisoned Wells: The Dirty Politics of African Oil. In 2011 he wrote Treasure Islands: Tax Havens and the Men who Stole the World. In 2018, he published The Finance Curse: How global finance is making us all poorer.

In 2021 he co-founded the Balanced Economy Project, Europe’s first general purpose anti-monopoly organisation since the 2000s. He left in 2024 to write a book on monopolies and market power.

Shaxson currently lives with his partner and their two children in Berlin.

== Awards and honours ==
- 2012 Bread and Roses Award, shortlist, Treasure Islands.
- 2017 Medallion, Society of the Silurians, Vanity Fair, Snakes on a Campaign.

== See also ==
- Tax Justice Network
- Corporate tax haven
- Tax haven
- Ireland as a tax haven

== Bibliography ==
- Shaxson, Nicholas (13 May 2008). Poisoned Wells: The Dirty Politics of African Oil. Palgrave Macmillan. ISBN 978-0-230-60532-9.
- Shaxson, Nicholas (6 January 2011). Treasure Islands: Tax Havens and the Men who Stole the World. Bodley Head. ISBN 978-1-84792-110-9.
- Shaxson, Nicholas (11 October 2018). The Finance Curse: How Global Finance Is Making Us All Poorer. Bodley Head. ISBN 978-1-84792-538-1.
- Shaxson, Nicholas (1 January 2014). Le isole del tesoro. Viaggio nei paradisi fiscali dove è nascosto il tesoro della globalizzazione. Feltrinelli. ISBN 978-8807883590.
- Shaxson, Nicholas (1 January 2014). Las islas del tesoro : los paraísos fiscales y los hombres que se robaron el mundo. Fondo de Cultura Económica. ISBN 978-9877190052.
