= Ashoka Mody =

Indian economist and IMF mission chief to Ireland

- Born: 14 January 1956 (age 70); India

Academic background
- Education: IIT Madras (BTech); Centre for Development Studies (MPhil); Boston University (PhD)

Academic work
- Discipline: Economics - emerging markets' access to foreign capital
- Institutions: Princeton University
- Website: Information at IDEAS / RePEc

Ashoka Mody (born 14 January 1956) is an Indian-American economist. He is the Charles and Marie Robertson visiting professor in international economic policy and lecturer in public and international affairs at the Princeton School of Public and International Affairs.

== Education ==
Mody studied Electronics at the Indian Institute of Technology at Madras. After his B.Tech. (1978) he switched fields and obtained a M.Phil. in Applied Economics at the Centre for Development Studies in Trivandrum 1979, where he worked as a Research Associate until completing his PhD in Economics from Boston University in 1986.

== Career ==
He briefly joined AT&T Bell Laboratories as a member of their technical staff before joining the World Bank where he worked from 1987 to 2003. In 1997/1998, Mody was a visiting professor of public policy at the Wharton School. From 2001 until his retirement, Mody was the assistant director of the International Monetary Fund's European Department. He is opposed to fiscal austerity as a means to resolve credit crises.

He was the chief IMF representative to Ireland during Ireland's troika bailout. Mody was critical of the troika for severity of the austerity regime enforced on Ireland. He was also critical of the Irish Government's lack of solidarity with other indebted EU nations and claimed that Irish Finance Minister Michael Noonan "blew it" by siding with the troika in 2015, when a debt reduction might have been reached. Mody noted in 2018 that Ireland's heavy exposure to U.S. multinationals for its business model would be a problem post the Tax Cuts and Jobs Act of 2017 reforms.

He is also affiliated with Bruegel in Brussels.

== Attempt on Mody's life ==
In October 2009 as Mody returned to his home in Bethesda, Maryland when he was shot multiple times whilst in his car by a masked gunman who then fled on foot. Police issued an arrest warrant for Mohau Mercy Mathibe who worked for a trial period at the IMF under Mody. The assailant was suspected to be denied a promotion, leaving him embittered enough to commit the crime.

== Personal life ==
Mody is married and has two children.

== Bibliography ==
- Mody, Ashoka (2014). Foreign Direct Investment and the World Economy. Routledge. ISBN 978-0415654876.
- Mody, Ashoka (2018). EuroTragedy: A Drama in Nine Acts. OUP USA. ISBN 978-0199351381.
- Mody, Ashoka (2023). India Is Broken A People Betrayed, Independence to Today. Redwood City: Stanford University Press. ISBN 978-1-5036-3422-0. OCLC 1354208737.

== See also ==
- Post-2008 Irish banking crisis
- Ireland as a tax haven
- Economic Adjustment Programme for Ireland
- Post-2008 Irish economic downturn
