= Tax Justice Network =

Independent tax advocacy group

- Abbreviation: TJN
- Formation: March 2003 formal November 2002 informal
- Founder: 28 co-founders
- Founded at: London
- Type: NGO
- Purpose: tax avoidance, tax competition, tax evasion, and tax havens.
- Headquarters: 38 Stanley Avenue, Chesham, Buckinghamshire, HP5 2JG, United Kingdom.
- Official language: English
- Chief Executive: Alex Cobham
- Revenue: £1,111,981 ($1,556,773) (2016)
- Website: www.taxjustice.net

The Tax Justice Network (TJN) is a British advocacy group consisting of a coalition of researchers and activists with a shared concern about tax avoidance, tax competition, and tax havens.

== Activity ==
=== Research ===
The TJN has reported on the OECD Base erosion and profit shifting (BEPS) projects and conducted their own research that the scale of corporate taxes being avoided by multinationals is an estimated $660 billion in 2012 (a quarter of US multinationals’ gross profits), which is equivalent to 0.9% of World GDP.

In July 2012, following a study into wealthy individuals with offshore accounts, the Tax Justice Network published claims regarding deposits worth at least $21 trillion (£13 trillion), potentially even $32 trillion, in secretive tax havens. As a result, governments suffer a lack of income taxes of up to $280 billion.

In November 2020, the TJN published "The State of Tax Justice 2020" report. It claims $427 billion is lost every year to tax abuse. Further annual reports have subsequently been issued. Most recently in 2025.

=== Financial Secrecy Index ===
The Financial Secrecy Index is a biennial publication of the TJN which was started in 2009 and was last released in February 2020. It covers 133 global jurisdictions and produces a "Secrecy Indicator" score for each based on 20 qualitative criteria. Releases are widely covered in the media.

=== Corporate Tax Haven Index ===
The Corporate Tax Haven Index is a biennial publication of the TJN which had its inaugural publication in May 2019. It covers 64 global jurisdictions and produces a "Corporate Tax Haven Index" value by combining two core measures; first a "Haven Score" based on 20 mostly tax related criteria, second a "Global Scale Weight" showing the scale of activity. Release are widely covered in the media.

=== Publicity ===
Experts of TJN appeared at public hearings of the Finance Committee of the German Bundestag in 2016.

== Funding ==
TJN has been rated as 'highly transparent' in its funding by Transparify and has been given an A grade for funding transparency by Who Funds You?

== Leadership and authors ==
- John Christensen, founding director and chief executive 2003-2016, board chair 2016-2021
- Richard Murphy, co-founder and research director 2003-2010
- Alex Cobham, chief executive since 2016

Notable authors who have worked with TJN include accounting scholar Prem Sikka, activist Sony Kapoor, journalist Nicholas Shaxson, and legal scholar Sol Picciotto.

== See also ==
- Association for the Taxation of Financial Transactions and for Citizens' Action
- Tax Foundation
- Offshore financial centre
- Corporate haven
- Tax haven
