= Ex post facto law =

Law with retroactive effect

An ex post facto law is a law that retrospectively changes the legal consequences or status of actions that were committed, or relationships that existed, before the enactment of the law. In criminal law, it may criminalize actions that were legal when committed; it may aggravate a crime by bringing it into a more severe category than it was in when it was committed; it may change the punishment prescribed for a crime, as by adding new penalties or extending sentences; it may extend the statute of limitations; or it may alter the rules of evidence in order to make conviction for a crime likelier than it would have been when the deed was committed.

Examples of ex post facto laws include amnesty laws which may decriminalize certain acts. Alternatively, rather than redefining the relevant acts as non-criminal, it may simply prohibit prosecution; or it may enact that there is to be no punishment, but leave the underlying conviction technically unaltered. A pardon has a similar effect, except it applies in just one case instead of a class of cases. Other legal changes may alleviate possible punishments retroactively, for example by replacing the death sentence with lifelong imprisonment. Such legal changes are also known by the Latin term in mitius. The principle of lex mitior ("the milder law") provides that, if the law has changed after an offense was committed, the version of the law that applies is the one that is more advantageous for the accused. This means that ex post facto laws apply in European jurisdictions to the extent that they are the milder law. Polls show in some cases majority support for retroactive laws and transitional justice.

Some common-law jurisdictions do not permit retroactive criminal legislation, though new precedent generally applies to events that occurred before the judicial decision. Some countries, such as the United States, explicitly forbid ex post facto laws in their constitution. In some nations that follow the doctrine of parliamentary supremacy, ex post facto laws may be possible. In a nation with an entrenched bill of rights or a written constitution, ex post facto legislation may be prohibited or allowed, and this provision may be general or specific. For example, Article 29 of the Constitution of Albania explicitly allows retroactive effect for laws that alleviate possible punishments.

Ex post facto criminalization is prohibited by Article 7 of the European Convention on Human Rights, Article 15(1) of the International Covenant on Civil and Political Rights, and Article 9 of the American Convention on Human Rights.

== Ex post facto laws by country ==
=== Australia ===
Australia has no strong constitutional prohibition on ex post facto laws, although narrowly retrospective laws might violate the constitutional separation of powers principle. Australian courts normally interpret statutes with a strong presumption that they do not apply retrospectively.

Retrospective laws designed to prosecute what was perceived to have been a blatantly unethical means of tax avoidance were passed in the early 1980s by the Fraser government (see Bottom of the harbour tax avoidance). Similarly, legislation criminalising certain war crimes retrospectively has been held to be constitutional (see Polyukhovich v Commonwealth).

Australia participated in drafting the Universal Declaration of Human Rights and was an original signatory in 1948. The Declaration includes a prohibition on retrospectively holding anyone guilty of a penal offence that was not an offence at the time it was committed. The Australian Human Rights Commission states the Declaration is an "expression of the fundamental values which are shared by all members of the international community" but "does not directly create legal obligations for countries."

Australia is a party to the International Covenant on Civil and Political Rights. The implementation of retrospective criminal laws is expressly prohibited by the Covenant. Australia is also a party to the Optional Protocol to the International Covenant on Civil and Political Rights. The Protocol enables individuals subject to the jurisdiction of a state party to file complaints with the United Nations Human Rights Committee for that state party's non-compliance with the International Covenant on Civil and Political Rights.

=== Brazil ===
According to the 5th Article, section XXXVI of the Brazilian Constitution, laws cannot have ex post facto effects that affect acquired rights, accomplished juridical acts and res judicata.

The same article in section XL prohibits ex post facto criminal laws. Like France, there is an exception when retroactive criminal laws benefit the accused person.

=== Canada ===
In Canada, ex post facto criminal laws are constitutionally prohibited by section 11(g) of the Charter of Rights and Freedoms. Also, under section 11(i) of the Charter, if the punishment for a crime has varied between the time the crime was committed and the time of sentencing following a conviction, the convicted person is entitled to the lesser punishment. Due to section 1 and section 33 of the Charter of Rights and Freedoms these rights are not absolute, and may be overridden.

The Canada sex offender registry, which went into effect on December 15, 2004, is somewhat retroactive. When the registry was created, all offenders who were on the Ontario sex offender registry, which was created in 2001, were required to register on the national registry. In addition, sex offenders in all provinces who were serving a sentence (whether imprisoned or on probation or parole) on December 15, 2004, were required to register, regardless of when their offense and conviction occurred. However, the registry was not retroactive to anybody who had completed their sentence by late 2004 and was not on the Ontario registry. Canadian courts have never ruled on the somewhat retroactive nature of the sex offender registry, since this seems to have never been challenged.

Sex offender registration was not mandatory for sex offenders until 2011, and had to be ordered by a judge. Sex offender registration was seemingly mandatory for people convicted before December 15, 2004, who were serving a sentence on that date, but was only optional for sex offenders convicted between December 15, 2004, and January 1, 2011.

Because section 11 of the Charter is among the sections that can be overridden under section 33 (the notwithstanding clause), Parliament could in theory enact ex post facto laws by invoking section 33. However, the federal Parliament, which has exclusive jurisdiction over criminal law, has never attempted to enact an ex post facto law (or any other law) using section 33.

The Charter prohibition applies only to criminal law. Changes to civil law in Canada can be, and occasionally are, enacted ex post facto. In one example, convicted murderer Colin Thatcher was ordered to forfeit proceeds from a book he had published (after being paroled from prison) under a Saskatchewan law. Although the law was passed long after Thatcher's murder conviction, the courts have ruled that such laws prescribe only civil penalties (as opposed to additional criminal penalties) and are thus not subject to Charter restrictions.

=== Croatia ===
Article 90 of the Constitution of Croatia states that "only individual provisions of a law may have a retroactive effect for exceptionally justified reasons". According to Croatian legal scholar Branko Smerdel, this means that "a law cannot be applied retroactively as a whole, and regulations enacted pursuant to statutory authority can never be applied retroactively".

=== Denmark ===
Following the liberation of Denmark from Nazi occupation in 1945, the Folketing, heavily influenced by the Frihedsråd, passed a special law (Lov Nr. 259 af 1. Juni 1945 om Tillæg til Borgerlig Straffelov angaaende Forræderi og anden landsskadelig Virksomhed, colloquially landsforræderloven (the traitor law) or strafferetstillægget (the penal code addendum)), temporarily reintroducing the death penalty (previously abolished in 1930) for acts of treason committed during German occupation. Passed on 1 June 1945, the law applied to actions performed subsequent to 9 April 1940, unless those actions were done under orders from the government prior to 29 August 1943. With this authorization, 103 death sentences were issued, of which 46 were carried out.

=== Finland ===
Generally, the Finnish legal system does not permit ex post facto laws, especially those that would expand criminal responsibility. They are not expressly forbidden; instead, the ban is derived from more general legal principles and basic rights. In civil matters, such as taxation, ex post facto laws may be made in some circumstances.

Historically there have been three exceptional instances when ex post facto criminal laws have been used in Finland.

1. Following the Finnish Civil War of 1918, the Parliament of Finland passed a law setting up tribunals to try suspected rebels. These tribunals issued death sentences in many cases, although very few of those accused could have committed a crime that carried the death penalty under Finnish law in force during the war. Several hundred people were executed under what was arguably an ex post facto legal arrangement. During the war, and before the tribunals were set up, thousands of people had been executed without trial by both sides. However, once this phase of the civil war ended, amnesty laws were passed. Thus, the legality of the actions of the government or the participants of either side of the war cannot be legally contested anymore.
2. After World War II, Finland was under pressure to convict political leaders whom the Allied powers considered responsible for Finnish involvement in the war. An ex post facto law was passed in the autumn of 1945 to permit prosecution for war responsibility, and eventually eight politicians were convicted. In another post-war case, the weapons cache case, an ex post facto law was passed in 1947 so that military personnel could be prosecuted for unofficially preparing for guerrilla resistance in case of Soviet occupation.
3. During World War II, desertion, draft dodging and conscientious objection were punishable by death or jail. Amnesty laws were passed after World War II to free deserters and draft dodgers from imprisonment and further prosecution and allow them to return home without further legal consequences.

=== France ===
In France, so-called "lois rétroactives" (retroactive laws) are technically prohibited by Article 2 of the Code Civil, which states that: "Legislation provides only for the future; it has no retrospective operation". In practice, however, since the Code Civil does not have the status of constitutional legislation and can therefore be overruled by subsequent laws, the Conseil Constitutionnel has determined that retroactive laws can be passed within certain limits – such as in the case of financial or tax legislation –, particularly where it is considered to be in the "general interest"; this has been demonstrated by a series of decisions handed down by the Conseil Constitutionnel concerning retroactive tax laws.

However, in criminal law, ex post facto sanctions are effectively forbidden as per Article 112-1 of the French Penal Code, except in cases wherein the retroactive application benefits the accused person (called retroactivity in mitius). They are also considered unconstitutional, since the principle of non-retroactivity is laid down in Article 8 of the Declaration of the Rights of Man and of the Citizen, which has constitutional status under French law. The épuration légale trials held after the 1944 liberation of France introduced the status of indignité nationale for Nazi collaborators as a way to avoid ex post facto law.

=== Germany ===
Article 103 of the German basic law requires that an act may be punished only if it has already been punishable by law at the time it was committed (specifically: by written law, Germany following civil law).

Robert A. Taft, at the time a U.S. Senator from Ohio, asserted that the Nuremberg Trials following World War II were based on ex post facto law because the Allies did not negotiate the Nuremberg Charter, which defined crimes against humanity and created the International Military Tribunal, until well after the acts charged. Others, including the International Military Tribunal, argued that the London Charter merely restated and provided jurisdiction to prosecute offenses that were already made unlawful by the Kellogg–Briand Pact, the Covenant of the League of Nations, and the various Hague Conventions.

William O. Douglas complained that the Allies were guilty of "substituting power for principle" at Nuremberg Trials because the actions of the defendants were lawful in the 1930s Germany. He contended that the Nuremberg Trials were implementing laws after the fact (that is, ex post facto) "to suit the clamor of the time." American Chief Justice Harlan Stone, likewise, called the Nuremberg Trials a "fraud" because of the ex post facto laws.

The problem of ex post facto law was also relevant in the 1990s after German reunification as there was a discussion about the trials against East German border troops who killed fugitives on the Inner-German border (Mauerschützen-Prozesse – Wall-shooters'/ -guards' trials). German courts in these cases recurred to the Radbruch formula.

=== Hungary ===
In 2010, the Hungarian National Assembly established a 98% punitive tax on any income over two million forints received either as a retirement package or as severance pay in the previous five years in the government sector. The law was repealed after an unfavorable ruling by the European Court of Human Rights and the Consitutional Court of Hungary deeming it unconstitutional. The Hungarian tax authority returned the sums it thus collected in 2014, reduced by a general tax ranging from 15 to 40 percent.

In 2026, the Assembly passed an amendment to the Fundamental Law of Hungary under which no person can serve as prime minister for more than a total of eight years since May 2 of 1990. At the time of its signing, the sole person affected by the amendment is former prime minister Viktor Orbán.

=== India ===
In India, without using the expression "ex post facto law", the underlying principle has been adopted in the article 20(1) of the Indian Constitution in the following words:

No person shall be convicted of any offence except for violation of a law in force at the time of the commission of the act charged as an offence, nor be subjected to a penalty greater than that which have been inflicted under the law in force at the time of commission of the offence.

Further, what article 20(1) prohibits is conviction and sentence under an ex post facto law for acts done prior thereto, but not the enactment or validity of such a law. There is, thus, a difference between the Indian and the American positions on this point; whereas in the United States, an ex post facto law is in itself invalid, it is not so in India. The courts may also interpret a law in such a manner that any objection against it of retrospective operation may be removed.

An example for retrospective law in India is the Karnataka Scheduled Castes and Scheduled Tribes (Prohibition of Transfer of Certain Lands) Act, 1978 in the state of Karnataka.

=== Indonesia ===
The Indonesian Constitution prohibits trying citizens under retroactive laws in any circumstance. This was tested in 2004 when the conviction of Masykur Abdul Kadir, one of the Bali bombers, under retroactive anti-terrorist legislation was quashed.

=== Iran ===
Ex post facto laws, in all contexts, are prohibited by Article 169 (Chapter 11) of the Iranian Constitution.

=== Ireland ===
In 1922, during the Irish Civil War, Anti-Treaty IRA members Rory O'Connor, Liam Mellows, Richard "Dick" Barrett and Joseph McKelvey were executed ex post facto and without trial, just two days into the existence of the Irish Free State. Despite being imprisoned for over four months, following their deaths the Third Dáil retrospectively approved their executions for a crime that had only been legislated against. Largely, the executions were considered retribution for the assassination of the legislator, Deputy Seán Hales TD the previous day.

During a post–Civil War period of increased activity by physical force Irish republicans, an appendix of the Constitution (Amendment No. 17) Act 1931 which was passed without referendum allowed that its new military tribunals could try offences from before that act was brought into force, as long as an Executive Minister believed the supposed offence was "impairing or impeding the machinery of government or the administration of justice." This was criticised in a dissent by Chief Justice Hugh Kennedy in State (Ryan) v Lennon which has since been highly celebrated. Kennedy referenced Alexander Hamilton's statement in The Federalist Papers that retroactive criminal sanctions "have been, in all ages, the favorite and most formidable instruments of tyranny." However, this was a natural law argument and the Court's majority rejected it for being judicial overreach.

The imposition of retroactive criminal sanctions is prohibited by Article 15.5.1° of the subsequent Irish Constitution introduced by Éamon de Valera in 1937. Retroactive changes of the civil law have also been found to violate the constitution when they would have resulted in the loss in a right to damages before the courts, the Irish Supreme Court having found that such a right is a constitutionally protected property right.

Ireland does not currently recognise the principle of lex mitior.

=== Israel ===
Israel enacted the 1950 Nazis and Nazi Collaborators (Punishment) Law for the purpose of punishing acts that occurred during the Second World War and the Holocaust, when Israel did not exist as a state. The law was used to punish Adolf Eichmann and others.

=== Italy ===
Article 25, paragraph 2, of the Italian Constitution, establishing that "nobody can be punished but according to a law come into force before the deed was committed", prohibits indictment pursuant a retroactive law. Article 11 of preliminary provisions to the Italian Civil Code and Article 3, paragraph 1, of the Statute of taxpayer's rights, prohibit retroactive laws on principle: such provisions can be derogated, however, by acts having force of the ordinary law; on the contrary, non-retroactivity in criminal law is thought absolute.

=== Japan ===
Article 39 of the constitution of Japan prohibits the retroactive application of laws. Article 6 of Criminal Code of Japan further states that if a new law comes into force after the deed was committed, the lighter punishment must be given.

=== Lithuania ===
Lithuania has no constitutional prohibition on ex post facto laws. However, as a signatory of the European Convention on Human Rights and as a member of the European Union whose Charter of Fundamental Rights has the effect of law, any retroactive law could still be struck down. Retroactive criminal sanctions are prohibited by Article 2, Part 1 (Chapter 1) of the Criminal Code of the Republic of Lithuania. Retroactive administrative sanctions are prohibited by Article 8 of the Administrative Code of the Republic of Lithuania.

Lithuanian lawyer Dainius Žalimas contends that there has been retroactive application of the law on Genocide (and subsequently adopted articles of the Criminal Code) against participants in Soviet repressions against Lithuanian guerilla fighters and their supporters, and gives examples of such decisions. The Article 99 of the Criminal Code of the Republic of Lithuania was introduced only on September 26, 2000, and therefore cannot be used in events of 1944–1953.

=== Mexico ===
According to the first and second paragraphs of the 14th Article of the Mexican Constitution, retroactive application of the law is prohibited if it is detrimental to a person's rights, but a new law can be applied if it benefits the person.

=== Netherlands ===
Article 4 of the Law on General Provisions (in effect since 1838) states that "The law has no retroactive effect".

Article 1 of Criminal Law states that no act is punishable without a pre-existing law, and that in the case an act was punishable but the law was changed after the criminal act the "most favorable" (to the suspect) of the two laws will apply.

In Civil Law there is no such provision.

=== New Zealand ===
Section 7 of the Interpretation Act 1999 stipulates that enactments do not have retrospective effect. The New Zealand Bill of Rights Act 1990 also affirms New Zealand's commitment to the International Covenant on Civil and Political Rights and Universal Declaration of Human Rights, with section 26 preventing the application of retroactive penalties. This is further reinforced under section 6(1) of the current Sentencing Act 2002 which provides, "[p]enal enactments not to have retrospective effect to disadvantage of offender" irrespective of any provision to the contrary.

Section 26 of the Bill of Rights and the previous sentencing legislation, the Criminal Justice Act 1985, caused significant digression among judges when the New Zealand Parliament introduced legislation that had the effect of enacting a retrospective penalty for crimes involving an element of home invasion. Ultimately, the discrepancy was restricted with what some labelled artificial logic in the cases of R v Pora and R v Poumako.

=== Norway ===
Article 97 of the Norwegian Constitution prohibits any law to be given retroactive effect. The prohibition applies to both criminal and civil laws, but in some civil cases, only particularly unreasonable effects of retroactivity will be found unconstitutional.

=== Pakistan ===
Article 12 of the Constitution of Pakistan prohibits any law to be given retroactive effect by stating:

- 12.1 – No law shall authorize the punishment of a person:-
- 12.1.a – for an act or omission that was not punishable by law at the time of the act or omission; or
- 12.1.b – for an offence by a penalty greater than, or of a kind different from, the penalty prescribed by law for that offence at the time the offence was committed.

=== Philippines ===
The 1987 Constitution of the Philippines categorically prohibits the passing of any ex post facto law. Article III (Bill of Rights), Section 22 specifically states: "No ex post facto law or bill of attainder shall be enacted."

However, the Cybercrime Prevention Act, which went into effect on October 3, 2012, is criticized for being ex post facto.

=== Poland ===
Retroactive application of law is prohibited by the Article 3 of the Polish civil code, and the legal rule prohibiting such retroactive application is commonly memorised as a Latin sentence Lex retro non agit ("A law does not apply retroactively"). The said article, however, allows retroactive application of an Act of Parliament if it is expressly understood from its text or purpose.

=== Portugal ===
Article 18 of the Portuguese Constitution forbids the retroactive application of any law the restricts right; article 29 of the Portuguese Constitution forbids retroactive application of criminal law; article 103 forbids the application of retroactive taxes.

=== Romania ===
Article 15 (2) of the Romanian Constitution provides that the law shall only act for the future, except for the more favourable criminal or administrative law.

=== Russia ===
Ex post facto punishment in criminal and administrative law is prohibited by article 54 of the Russian Constitution; ex post facto tax laws by article 57 of the constitution. Criminal law which improves the position of the convicted has retroactive force according to article 10 of the Russian Criminal Code.

=== Spain ===
Article 9.3 of the Spanish Constitution guarantees the principle of non-retroactivity of punitive provisions that are not favorable to or restrictive of individual rights. Therefore, "ex post facto" criminal laws or any other retroactive punitive provisions are constitutionally prohibited.

As well as Statute law mentioned above, this now also includes 'court-made law'. The Parot doctrine, in which terrorists were denied the right (enshrined in a 1973 Statute) to earn a reduction in the length of their sentences by a Spanish court ruling in 2006 was judged by the European Court of Human Rights to be contrary to relevant articles on retroactivity & liberty and security in 2013.

=== South Africa ===
Section 35(3) of the South African Bill of Rights prohibits ex post facto criminal laws, except that acts which violated international law at the time they were committed may be prosecuted even if they were not illegal under national law at the time. It also prohibits retroactive increases of criminal punishments.

=== Sweden ===
In Sweden, retroactive penal sanctions and other retroactive legal effects of criminal acts due the State are prohibited by chapter 2, section 10 of the Instrument of Government (Regeringsformen). Retroactive taxes or charges are not prohibited, but they can have retroactive effect reaching back only to the time when a new tax bill was proposed by the government. The retroactive effect of a tax or charge thus reaches from that time until the bill is passed by the parliament.

As the Swedish Act of Succession was changed in 1979, and the throne was inherited regardless of sex, the inheritance right was withdrawn from all the descendants of Charles XIV John (king 1818–44) except the current king Carl XVI Gustaf. Thereby, the heir-apparent title was transferred from the new-born Prince Carl Philip to his older sister Crown Princess Victoria.

The Swedish Riksdag voted in 2004 to abolish inheritance tax by January 1, 2005. However, in 2005 they retro-actively decided to move the date to December 17, 2004. The main reason was abolishing inheritance tax for the many Swedish victims of the 2004 Indian Ocean earthquake, which took place on December 26.

=== Turkey ===
Ex post facto punishment is prohibited by Article 38 of the Constitution of Turkey. It states:

- c1. No one shall be punished for any act which does not constitute a criminal offence under the law in force at the time committed; no one shall be given a heavier penalty for an offence other than the penalty applicable at the time when the offence was committed.
- c2. The provisions of the above paragraph shall also apply to the statute of limitations on offences and penalties and on the results of conviction.

Thus, the article does not prohibit in mitius laws, i.e. cases wherein the retroactive application benefits the accused person.

=== Ukraine ===
Article 58 of the Constitution of Ukraine says: "Laws and other regulatory acts shall have no retroactive force except where they mitigate or nullify the responsibility of a person. No one shall bear responsibility for acts that, at the time they were committed, were not deemed by law to be an offence."

=== United Kingdom ===
In the United Kingdom, ex post facto laws are permitted by virtue of the doctrine of parliamentary sovereignty. Historically, all acts of Parliament before 1793 were ex post facto legislation, inasmuch as their date of effect was the first day of the session in which they were passed. This situation was rectified by the Acts of Parliament (Commencement) Act 1793.

Some laws are still passed retrospectively: e.g., the Pakistan Act 1990 (by which the United Kingdom amended its legislation consequent to the Commonwealth of Nations having re-admitted Pakistan as a member) was one such law; despite being passed on 29 June 1990, section 2 subsection 3 states that "This Act shall be deemed to have come into force on 1st October 1989", nine months before it was enacted.

Retrospective criminal laws are prohibited by Article 7 of the European Convention on Human Rights, to which the United Kingdom is a signatory, but some legal authorities have stated their opinion that parliamentary sovereignty takes priority even over this. For example, the War Crimes Act 1991 created an ex post facto jurisdiction of British courts over war crimes committed during the Second World War. Another important example of a case which shows the doctrine of parliamentary supremacy in action is in relation to Burmah Oil Co Ltd v Lord Advocate, where the decision of the courts was overridden with retrospective effect by the War Damage Act 1965, which changed the law on compensation resulting from scorched earth actions in Burma during the war. More recently, the Police (Detention and Bail) Act 2011 retroactively overrode a controversial court judgment resulting from an error in the drafting of the Police and Criminal Evidence Act 1984 that would potentially have invalidated thousands of criminal convictions. A court faced with an ex post facto act of Parliament could theoretically issue a declaration of incompatibility with Article 7, but would still be required to enforce it, as UK courts do not have the power of judicial review with respect to primary legislation.

Another example of an ex post facto criminal law in the UK is the Criminal Justice Act 2003. This law allows people acquitted of murder and certain other serious offences to be retried if there is "new, compelling, reliable and substantial evidence" that the acquitted person really was guilty. This Act applies retroactively and can be used to re-prosecute people who were acquitted before it came into force in 2005, or even before it was passed in 2003. As a result, two of the defendants who were acquitted in the murder of Stephen Lawrence were allowed to be retried, even though this murder occurred in 1993 and the defendants had been acquitted in 1996. Many people have criticized the Criminal Justice Act because of its essential abolition of prohibition against both ex post facto and double jeopardy laws.

Taxation law has on multiple occasions been changed to retrospectively disallow tax avoidance schemes. The most significant example known concerns double-taxation treaty arrangements where the Finance Act 2008 with BN66 retrospectively amended 1987 legislation, creating large tax liabilities for 3,000 people where no liability existed before.

=== United States ===
Thomas Jefferson, one of the Founding Fathers of the United States, stated in 1813 that:

The sentiment that ex post facto laws are against natural right is so strong in the United States, that few, if any, of the State constitutions have failed to proscribe them. ... The federal constitution indeed interdicts them in criminal cases only; but they are equally unjust in civil as in criminal cases, and the omission of a caution which would have been right, does not justify the doing what is wrong. Nor ought it to be presumed that the legislature meant to use a phrase in an unjustifiable sense, if by rules of construction it can be ever strained to what is just.

— Thomas Jefferson, Letter to Isaac McPherson, August 13, 1813

Congress is prohibited from passing ex post facto laws by clause 3 of Article I, Section 9 of the United States Constitution. The states are prohibited from passing ex post facto laws by clause 1 of Article I, Section 10. This is one of the relatively few restrictions that the United States Constitution made to both the power of the federal and state governments before the Fourteenth Amendment. Over the years, however, when deciding ex post facto cases, the United States Supreme Court has referred repeatedly to its ruling in Calder v. Bull, in which Justice Samuel Chase held that the prohibition applied only to criminal matters, not civil matters, and established four categories of unconstitutional ex post facto laws. The case dealt with the Article I, Section 10, prohibition on ex post facto laws, because it concerned a Connecticut state law.

As a result of Calder v. Bull, several retroactive taxes have been passed by the US Congress, starting with the 1913 Revenue Act, which imposed the first income tax. By 1935, prohibitions on retroactive taxation had been declared "dead." In 1938, the US Supreme Court claimed the standard on retroactive taxation was "retroactive application is so harsh and oppressive as to transgress the constitutional limitation." In practice, this has resulted in virtually all retroactive taxes being upheld, and in one case a 1993 revision of tax law that applied retroactively to 1984 was upheld.

Not all laws with retroactive effects have been held to be unconstitutional. One current U.S. law that has a retroactive effect is the Adam Walsh Child Protection and Safety Act of 2006. This law imposes new registration requirements on convicted sex offenders and also applies to offenders whose crimes were committed before the law was enacted. The U.S. Supreme Court ruled in Smith v. Doe (2003) that requiring sex offenders to register their whereabouts at regular intervals, and the posting of personal information about them on the Internet, do not violate the constitutional prohibition against ex post facto laws, because these laws do not impose any kind of punishment.

In Starkey v. Oklahoma Department of Corrections, the Supreme Court of the State of Oklahoma found the Oklahoma Sex Offender Registration Act, or SORA, to be punitive in nature, if not in intent. While the law in question had been ruled as not being retroactive in nature, the Oklahoma Department of Corrections had been applying the new legislation retroactively. The court found that "the Department's retroactive application of the level assignment provisions of 57 O.S. Supp. 2007, 582.1 – 582.5, as amended, violates the ex post facto clause."

Controversy has also arisen with regard to sexually violent predator (SVP) laws, which allow the indefinite commitment of a person with a mental abnormality which predisposes them to molest children. This issue arose in the case Kansas v. Hendricks. In Hendricks, a man with a long history of sexually molesting children was scheduled to be released from prison shortly after the enactment of Kansas's SVP act. Rather than being released, he was committed on the grounds that he had a mental abnormality. Hendricks contested the law on ex post facto and double jeopardy grounds. The Supreme Court of Kansas invalidated the Act, but the Supreme Court of the United States reversed the decision and ruled that the law was constitutional on the basis that the law did not impose a criminal punishment.

A further example is the Domestic Violence Offender Gun Ban, where firearms prohibitions were imposed on those convicted of misdemeanor domestic-violence offenses and on subjects of restraining orders (which do not require criminal conviction). These individuals can now be sentenced to up to ten years in a federal prison for possession of a firearm, regardless of whether the weapon was legally possessed when the law was passed. The law has been legally upheld because it is considered regulatory, not punitive; it is a status offense.

Another example is the Copyright Term Extension Act, which was retroactive since it affected both new works and existing ones, but it was upheld by decision Eldred v. Ashcroft. Also, the Uruguay Round Agreement Act, which restored copyright in foreign works, removing them from the public domain, was upheld by another decision, Golan v. Holder.

The US military also recognizes ex post facto law. Common law states that Courts-martial will not enforce an ex post facto law, including increasing amount of pay to be forfeited for specific crimes. (See United States v. Gorki 47 M.J. 370).

Finally, in Calder v. Bull, the court expressly stated that a law that "mollifies" a criminal act was merely retrospective, and was not an ex post facto law. Scholars have argued that, as a historical matter, the phrase ex post facto referred to civil as well as criminal laws.

In administrative law, federal agencies may apply their rules retroactively if Congress has authorized them to; otherwise, retroactive application is generally prohibited. Retroactive application of regulations is disfavored by the courts for several reasons. The courts uphold retroactive regulation where Congress has expressly granted such retroactive power to the agency, as they did in Bowen v. Georgetown University Hospital.

The rules as they relate to the effects of ex post facto upon the U.S. Federal Sentencing Guidelines can be found in U.S.S.G. § 1B1.11 (2012).

See also Bouie v. City of Columbia, Rogers v. Tennessee, Stogner v. California, Republic of Austria v. Altmann, James Bamford and Samuels v. McCurdy.

=== Vietnam ===
Ex post facto laws are defined in Article 152, 2015 Law on Promulgation of Legal Documents:

1. Only in cases of extreme necessity to ensure the common good of society, to exercise the rights and interests of organizations and individuals prescribed in laws and resolutions of the National Assembly, legal documents of central government rules are retroactive.
2. The retroactive effect is prohibited in the following cases: a) Impose legal liability for acts that at the time of committing such acts the law does not stipulate liability; b) Impose higher legal liability.
3. Legislative documents of People's Councils, People's Committees at all levels, local governments in special administrative-economic units are not retroactive.

There has been no case that new law stated it has a retroactive effect. But the second item of this Article has been widely used in court system (in mitius laws).

== Treatment by international organizations and treaties ==
=== International criminal law ===
In international criminal law, the Nuremberg trials prosecuted war crimes and crimes against humanity perpetrated in World War II. Although the Nuremberg Charter, the procedural law under which the trials were held, postdated V-E Day, the tribunal rejected the defence that the criminal law was ex post facto, arguing it derived from earlier treaties like the Hague Conventions of 1899 and 1907. The International Criminal Court established in 2002 that it cannot prosecute crimes committed before 2002.

=== Universal Declaration of Human Rights and related treaties ===
Article 11, paragraph 2 of the Universal Declaration of Human Rights provides that no person be held guilty of any criminal law that did not exist at the time of offence nor suffer any penalty heavier than what existed at the time of offence. It does however permit application of either domestic or international law.

Very similar provisions are found in Article 15, paragraph 1 of the International Covenant on Civil and Political Rights, replacing the term "penal offence" with "criminal offence". It also adds that if a lighter penalty is provided for after the offence occurs, that lighter penalty shall apply retroactively. Paragraph 2 adds a provision that paragraph 1 does not prevent trying and punishing for an act that was criminal according to the general principles of law recognized by the community of nations. Specifically addressing the use of the death penalty, article 6, paragraph 2 provides in relevant part that a death sentence may only be imposed "for the most serious crimes in accordance with the law in force at the time of the commission of the crime".

=== African Charter on Human and Peoples' Rights ===
Article 2, paragraph 7 of the African Charter on Human and Peoples' Rights provides in part that "no one may be condemned for an act or omission which did not constitute a legally punishable offence at the time it was committed. No penalty may be inflicted for an offence for which no provision was made at the time it was committed."

=== American Declaration of the Rights and Duties of Man ===
Article 25 of the American Declaration of the Rights and Duties of Man provides in part that "[n]o person may be deprived of his liberty except in the cases and according to the procedures established by pre-existing law." The right to be tried in accordance to "pre-existing law" is reiterated in article 26.

=== Arab Charter on Human Rights ===
Article 15 of the Arab Charter on Human Rights provides that "[n]o crime and no penalty can be established without a prior provision of the law. In all circumstances, the law most favorable to the defendant shall be applied."

=== European Convention on Human Rights ===
All European states (except Belarus), including all European Union and European Economic Area states, are bound by the European Convention on Human Rights. Article 7 of the Convention mirrors the language of both paragraphs of Article 15 of the International Covenant on Political and Civil Rights, with the exception that it does not include that a subsequent lighter penalty must apply.

== Grammatical form and usage ==
The Digesta Iustiniani (15.3.10.8.3, 20.1.22.pr2) ("Digest of Justinian") contains the two-word phrase ex postfacto: "out of a postfactum" (an after-deed), or more naturally, "from a law passed afterward". This same work, however, also makes use of the three-word phrase ex post facto, (2.14.17.4.2, 4.6.17.1.1, passim), suggesting that post might best be understood as an adverb. Other adverbial usages of post include the Classical Roman author and senator Marcus Tullius Cicero employing phrases such as multis post annis (De Re Publica 2.5.8 and elsewhere). Thus, ex post facto or ex postfacto is natively an adverbial phrase, a usage demonstrated by the sentence "He was convicted ex post facto (from a law passed after his crime)." The law itself would rightfully be a lex postfacta in Latin, although English generally uses the phrase "an ex post facto law".

In Poland the phrase lex retro non agit ("the law does not operate retroactively") is used.

== See also ==
- A priori and a posteriori
- An unjust law is no law at all
- Acts of Parliament (Commencement) Act 1793 – Act of the Parliament of Great Britain
- Ex ante
- Non-retroactivity – Legal principle
- Nulla poena sine lege – the principle that no one may be punished for an act which is not against the law
- Richard Roose
- Rokotov–Faibishenko case
- Grandfather clause, which specifically allows things allowed before a law
- Bill of attainder, a legislative act which convicts and sentences a person without trial
