= ContractorUK =

Organization

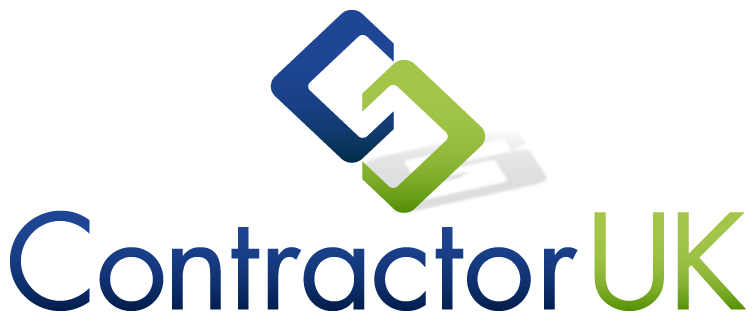
- Company type: Private
- Founded: 1999; 27 years ago
- Headquarters: Hemel Hempstead, Hertfordshire, United Kingdom
- Parent: Rocky-Messissi Limited
- Website: www.contractoruk.com

ContractorUK, is a British news and community website for independent contractors in the UK. It has been online since 1999, since the early days of IR35 and the initial inflation of the dot-com bubble.

The website is home to the UK's IT contracting community, with over 690,000 visits per month. It provides independent editorial on contracting as well as calculators, market rates, and contract jobs.

== History ==
The website was launched in 1999 and is operated by Rocky-Messissi Limited.

== Tax and legislation issues ==
ContractorUK reports on a wide range of issues that face contractors. This includes changes made by HMRC as well as the introduction of new and changes to existing tax legislation.

It has covered the most pressing issues in the contracting industry such as IR35, EBTs and BN66. It has also reported on the Budget, Autumn Statement and the Finance Bill, and how they will affect contractors. This includes the new legislation which will restrict tax relief for travel and subsistence for workers engaged through an employment intermediary, such as an umbrella company or a personal service company.

ContractorUK has covered news on the Personal Service Companies Committee, including a speech made by Baroness Noakes in the House of Lords in which she referenced ContractorUK.

== Campaigns ==
The ContractorUK Forum provides space in the forums, for the No To Retro Tax (NTRT) campaign group, who aim to overturn the retrospective tax legislation introduced in Section 58 of the UK Finance Act 2008.

== Forum ==
The site has a forum, with over 2 million posts, to discuss matters related to contracting (including umbrella companies, recruitment agencies, contracts, tax etc.), as well as areas for general chat. Here contractors are able to receive unbiased advice from other contractors. The forum also includes an ineffective swear filter.
