= Singapore Sling (tax avoidance) =

A Singapore Sling is a tax avoidance scheme in which a large multinational company sells products to a subsidiary owned by them in a jurisdiction with lower tax rates, which acts as a 'marketing hub'. The subsidiary then sells the product to end users, marking up its value and attributing the mark-up to various marketing activities undertaken by the subsidiary. The parent company retains a higher profit margin due to the lower tax rate. Singapore is a popular location of such subsidiaries, given its low tax rates and its willingness to grant large multinationals 'sweetheart deals' – an extremely low tax rate in exchange for locating the multinational's marketing activities in Singapore.

Since at least 2015, it has been under investigation as an abusive practice in Australia.

== See also ==
- Tax exporting
- Tax inversion
- Double Irish
- Dutch Sandwich
- Bermuda Black Hole
- K2
