= FTT =

FTT may refer to:

== Biology and medicine ==
- Failure to thrive, in children
- False tagging theory, a neuroanatomical model
- Fuzzy-trace theory, a theory of cognition

== Business and finance ==
- Fair Tax Town, a Welsh political movement
- Financial transaction tax
- FTT (token), code of the cryptocurrency exchange FTXs' exchange token

== Other uses ==
- First-tier Tribunal, in the UK
- Free Territory of Trieste, an independent territory in Southern Europe
