= Singapore Sling (disambiguation) =

Singapore sling is a cocktail named after the place where the drink was developed

Singapore Sling may also refer to:

- Singapore Sling (tax avoidance), a corporate tax avoidance scheme
- Singapore Sling (1990 film), a Greek art film
- Singapore Sling (1994 film), an Australian TV movie
- Singapore Sling (band), an Icelandic shoegaze rock 'n' roll band
- Singapore Slingers, a basketball team
- Singapore Sling, the nickname of the former turn 10 chicane at the Marina Bay Street Circuit
