= List of Dutch phrases =

There are a number of phrases that refer to Dutch people, or originate from the Netherlands.

== List ==
- Frjonskervegrikenbrugge
- Dutch uncle
- Double Dutch (jump rope)
- Going Dutch
- Dutch courage
- Dutch Sandwich
- Dutch roll
- Dutch Reach
