= Bermuda Black Hole =

Corporate tax avoidance strategy

Location of the British Overseas Territory of Bermuda.

The Bermuda black hole is a base erosion and profit shifting (BEPS) tax avoidance schemes in which untaxed global profits end up in Bermuda, which is considered a tax haven. The term was most associated with US technology multinationals such as Apple and Google who used Bermuda as the "terminus" for their Double Irish arrangement tax structure.

== Definition ==
"Bermuda black hole" was used in relation to US corporate tax strategies that routed un-taxed profits to Bermuda, where they did not emerge again for fear of being subject to US corporation tax. Instead, the untaxed profits were "lent out" to the corporate parent, or its subsidiaries, thus avoiding the risk of incurring US taxation. The Bermuda black hole led to US corporations amassing over US$1 trillion in offshore locations from 2004 to 2017 (before the Tax Cuts and Jobs Act of 2017).

A "Bermuda black hole" became the most favoured common final destination for the Double Irish with a Dutch Sandwich base erosion and profit shifting (BEPS) corporate tax avoidance strategy as used by US multinational technology firms in Ireland; and particularly Apple and Google. Apple's "Bermuda black hole", called Apple Operations Ireland ("AOI"), became part of a 2013 US Senate inquiry by Carl Levin and John McCain, which led to the 2014–2016 EU Commission inquiry and a US$13 billion fine, the largest corporate tax avoidance fine in history.

The term "black hole" is not unique to Bermuda and has been used to describe other uses of offshore tax havens, such as the "Cayman black hole".

== Replacement ==
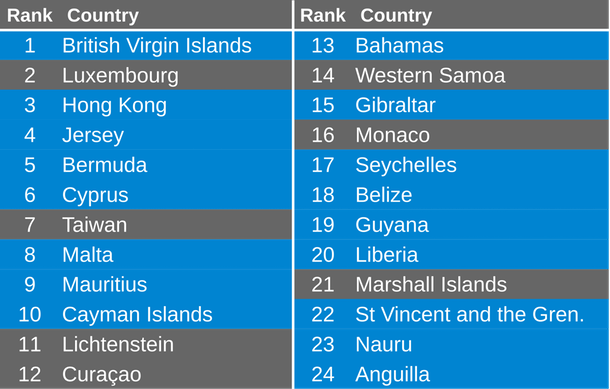
Uncovering Offshore Financial Centers: List of Sink OFCs ordered by value (highlighting U.K. dependencies)

A seminal 2017 academic study published in Nature magazine on the classification of tax havens and offshore financial centres used the related term of "Sink offshore financial centre", instead of "black hole", to describe locations like Bermuda as: "jurisdictions in which a disproportional amount of value disappears from the economic system". In the study Bermuda was ranked as the 5th largest of 24 Sink OFCs identified and classified in the study (see graphic).

The 2017 study, which was titled Uncovering Offshore Financial Centers: Conduits and Sinks in the Global Corporate Ownership Network, used quantitative analysis techniques to prove that some global jurisdictions act like corporate taxation "black holes" (e.g. the Sink OFCs), where funds are sent as their legal "terminus". However, the study showed how the Sink OFCs rely heavily on jurisdictions that act as Conduit OFCs in routing untaxed global profits to the "black holes".

== 2017 TCJA ==
Tax academics believe that the change in the US corporate tax code from the Tax Cuts and Jobs Act of 2017 (TCJA) should diminish the ability of US corporations to use offshore structures that shield untaxed profits from US taxation, such as "Bermuda black hole" (or Bermuda Sinks), as global US corporate income is now deemed automatically repatriated to the US under the TCJA. It is therefore likely that the term "Bermuda black hole" will not remain in common use.

== See also ==
- Tax haven
- Singapore Sling
- Dutch Sandwich
