= Karnataka Scheduled Castes and Scheduled Tribes (Prohibition of Transfer of Certain Lands) Act, 1978 =

Statute of Karnataka, India

The Karnataka Scheduled Castes and Scheduled Tribes (Prohibition of Transfer of Certain Lands) Act, 1978 (Karnataka Act 2 of 1979) or PTCL is a statute of Karnataka.

This law which was introduced in 1978 is retrospective in nature and is considered an ex post facto law. Currently over 10000 cases are pending before the office of the Deputy Commissioners across the State Karnataka. This law was created as a social welfare Act aiming to protect and provide land for the poor members of the scheduled Tribes and castes. But due to a lack of clarity and understanding between the judiciary and the administration there exists this large number of cases still hanging in the balance.

The preamble of the Act reads:

An Act to provide for the prohibition of transfer of certain lands granted by the government, to persons belonging to the scheduled castes and scheduled tribes in the state, which means any land granted to the landless agricultural labourers belonging to scheduled castes and scheduled tribes, cannot be purchased. Anyone who purchases such a property, will not get clear and marketable title; such property will be eventually acquired by Government and returned to the original owner without any compensation to the purchaser.

The problem lies in the fact that when the grantee goes to sell the land which he is not supposed to the government does not refuse to register this Sale but officially accepts it as a legal sale. Later the grantee goes back to the government and claims this land back. The law then says the land has to be returned to the grantee without any compensation.

== Limitations of the Act ==
- Land cannot be sold without permission from government within 15 years
- Most grantees sell the land immediately on receiving the granted land. This is officially registered as a Sale of Property by the government of Karnataka.The Transfer of Property Act 1882
- The original grantee or his heirs can claim the land back after 100 years even if land has changed hands officially through Registered Sale Deeds a number of times. Strangely The Limitation Act Does not apply to this law. Supreme Court has since ordered reasonable Limitation as referered in Nekkanti Rama Lakshmi vs State Of Karnataka on 26 October 2017 and other cases.
- This law is retrospective in natureEx post facto law#India
- The current owner should handover possession including building, trees etc. without any compensation even if taxes are paid and land has been registered in the purchasers name by the government of Karnataka.
- The current owner may have purchased it from another party and may be the third or fourth in line in which the property has changed hands. But only the current owner is expected to bear the loss of all accumulated purchases and sales
- International Real Estate Companies have warned about investing in Bangalore because this law does not have a Limited time period and other laws which lack clarity and need to be altered by the State Government of Karnataka for clarity and justice.,
