= Fair Tax Town =

The Fair Tax Town movement (FTT; also called the Powys tax rebellion) is a movement established by several shop owners in Crickhowell, Powys, Wales.

== Documentary ==
During the establishment of the movement, a documentary was made by the BBC along with it. This documentary, narrated by Heydon Prowse is called "The Town that went Offshore" or "The Town That Took on the Taxman" and was first shown in January 2016.

The movie follows the business owners as they decide to establish an untaxed Manx company which designs and owns a brand (Crickhowell Fair Tax), use the brand in their advertising and pay royalties for using this brand, as big companies do with their own brands. Their Manx company sets up a Dutch subsidiary which receives the royalties and sends them to the Isle of Man, since Britain would tax royalties sent directly to a tax haven, but charges no tax on royalty payments to the Netherlands, and the Netherlands charges no tax on royalties sent to tax havens. Thus their money accumulates tax-free in the Isle of Man, and the movie suggests ways to use it for expenses in Wales, such as borrowing it. The movie also discusses customer relationship managers which tax authorities assign to big businesses to ensure their tax arrangements are valid.

== Spreading the movement ==
The movement's aim is to persuade governments to change their tax regulation so that small businesses get the same level of tax as multinationals and other large businesses. To help achieve this, FTT has started to share their expertise on how to make businesses engage in tax avoidance. Since then, many other towns have adopted the scheme.

== Legacy ==
After spending two years developing and publicizing the project, the Crickhowell businesses decided not to proceed. Prowse, the documentarian, said he hoped another group of people would take the idea another step, "If you want to put your money through a scheme like that, you’ve got to expect that the taxman’s going to contact you and you’re going to have to defend yourself, possibly in court."
