= Tax exporting =

Tax exporting occurs when a country (or other jurisdiction) shifts its tax burden (partially) abroad.

For example, if residents of country A hold shares of a company in country B, the government in B might want to levy an inefficiently high tax on this company's profits since the tax is partially borne by the shareholders in A.

Tax exporting does not necessarily involve direct taxation of foreign residents. It can also work through other economic channels, such as price changes.

== See also ==
- Capital flight
- Capital strike
- Double Irish arrangement
- Luxembourg leaks
- Tax avoidance
- Tax competition
- Tax inversion
