= K2 (tax scheme) =

Offshore wealth management scheme run in Jersey, Channel Islands

K2 was an offshore wealth management scheme in which salaries of individuals in the United Kingdom were channelled through shell corporations in Jersey, Channel Islands. In June 2012, media reporting of people using K2 for the purposes of tax avoidance was followed by the United Kingdom's Prime Minister David Cameron characterising the scheme as "morally wrong". Later that year the UK government began to introduce legislation to deter people from using such schemes.

== Operation ==
The K2 scheme was promoted by a Kirkcaldy-based accounting firm, Peak Performance. The scheme involved companies having their main operations in the UK and shell companies offshore. An employee of the UK company would quit their job and then be rehired by the offshore company to the UK. The offshore company would pay a lower salary than the person was originally on but would additionally loan them a large sum of money. Those loans would then be written down as tax liabilities to reduce the amount of tax payable.

== Controversy ==
On 19 June 2012, The Times published an investigation into individual tax avoidance, estimating that around 1,100 people had been using the K2 scheme to avoid making tax payments totalling around £168 million. The Times report named comedian Jimmy Carr as the K2 scheme client who was the largest beneficiary of these arrangements, claiming that he was sheltering £3.3 million per year and only paid 1% tax through using the scheme. That evening, Carr was challenged on the matter at a show in Royal Tunbridge Wells. When an audience member told him he did not pay tax, Carr responded with "I pay what I have to and not a penny more." Speaking to ITV News, the Prime Minister of the United Kingdom at the time, David Cameron, called the scheme "morally wrong". Carr responded and issued a series of statements on his Twitter account; he apologised for using the scheme, stating it was a "terrible error of judgement" and that he had ceased using the K2 scheme. The Herald reported that the accounting firm promoting the scheme may have taken around 15% in commission. The Institute of Chartered Accountants of Scotland (ICAS) said they would investigate the K2 scheme and Peak Performance.

== HMRC crackdown ==
HM Revenue and Customs (HMRC) viewed K2 as a scheme for aggressive tax avoidance. In 2012, HMRC stated that they would be investigating how to challenge the scheme, stating if it worked technically, they would challenge it in court. In December 2012, the UK Government introduced the 2013 Finance Bill, which included a General Anti-Abuse Rule (GAAR) and a residency test, measures to deter people from using schemes like K2. In October 2013, Cameron announced an intention to publish a register of the owners of shell companies. In January 2014, having stopped using the K2 scheme, analysis of the accounts of Carr's company FN Good Limited suggested that corporation tax payments of around £500,000 were now being made. In March 2016, The Herald reported that firms running schemes like K2 had disappeared.
