= Dutch Sandwich =

Dutch withholding tax avoidance tool

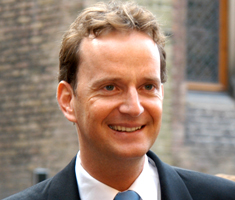
Ex. Dutch Minister Joop Wijn is credited with introducing the Dutch Sandwich IP-based BEPS tool (which is often used with the Double Irish BEPS tool), and the "Dutch Double Dip" Debt-based BEPS tool

Dutch Sandwich is a base erosion and profit shifting (BEPS) corporate tax tool, used mostly by U.S. multinationals to avoid incurring European Union withholding taxes on untaxed profits as they were being moved to non-EU tax havens (such as the Bermuda black hole). These untaxed profits could have originated from within the EU, or from outside the EU, but in most cases were routed to major EU corporate-focused tax havens, such as Ireland and Luxembourg, by the use of other BEPS tools. The Dutch Sandwich was often used with Irish BEPS tools such as the Double Irish, the Single Malt and the Capital Allowances for Intangible Assets ("CAIA") tools. In 2010, Ireland changed its tax-code to enable Irish BEPS tools to avoid such withholding taxes without needing a Dutch Sandwich.

== Explanation ==
The structure relies on the tax loophole that most EU countries will allow royalty payments be made to other EU countries without incurring withholding taxes. However, the Dutch tax code allows royalty payments to be made to several offshore tax havens (like Bermuda), without incurring Dutch withholding tax.

The method starts with a US parent company which will then create two Irish subsidiaries. Additionally, Ireland company 2 is a subsidiary of Ireland company 1. Ireland company 1 will be domiciled in Bermuda. Ireland company 2 is domiciled in Ireland. Ireland company 1 holds the company’s IP and licenses it to Ireland company 2. Ireland company 2 will then pay royalties to Ireland company 1, making the royalties tax-deductible for Ireland company 2 as it is accounted for as an expense. This means that Ireland company 2 is now only responsible for paying the Irish corporate tax on the remainder of their income at a rate of 12.5%. The Ireland company 2 will also file a check the box election in the US to be a “disregarded entity.”

The Dutch Sandwich therefore behaves like a "backdoor" out of the EU corporate tax system and into un-taxed non-EU offshore locations.

These royalty payments require the creation of intellectual property ("IP") licensing schemes, and therefore the Dutch sandwich is limited to specific sectors that are capable of generating substantial IP. This is most common in the technology, pharmaceutical, medical devices and specific industrial (who have patents) sectors.

Its creation is generally attributed to Joop Wijn (State Secretary of Economic Affairs in May 2003) after lobbying from U.S. tax lawyers from 2003 to 2006.

[When] former venture-capital executive at ABN Amro Holding NV Joop Wijn becomes State Secretary of Economic Affairs in May 2003 [, ... it's] not long before the Wall Street Journal reports about his tour of the US, during which he pitches the new Netherlands tax policy to dozens of American tax lawyers, accountants, and corporate tax directors. In July 2005, he decides to abolish the provision that was meant to prevent tax dodging by American companies, in order to meet criticism from tax consultants.

— Oxfam/De Correspondent, "How the Netherlands became a Tax Haven", 31 May 2017.

== Impact ==
As of 2020, "The Netherlands is an extremely attractive jurisdiction in which to locate a royalty conduit companies", although a withholding tax on royalties was announced for 2021 "for cases where abuse is involved" after international pressure.

As of 2016, "Multinationals moved some €22bn in royalties and interest through the Netherlands in 2016 in order to avoid tax, according to a new report for the finance ministry". Usage of this tax avoidance structure, alone, produced 10% of the income reported by shell companies in the Netherlands.

The method had a substantial impact on the Irish economy as well. Apple, having used this tax tactic, avoided paying United States corporate tax by using the Double Irish with a Dutch Sandwich on roughly $110 billion worth of overseas profit. By transferring these profits to subsidiaries in Ireland, the taxes were paid on Ireland’s rate instead of companies where people purchased Apple products. This occurrence is a good counterargument for the moral usage of the loophole, as the Irish government lost $13 billion in taxes. The entire situation caused a slight dip into economic recession within Ireland. The European Commission ended up investigating the matter, as tax evasion and avoidance are extremely major topics on the international agenda.

== Double Irish ==
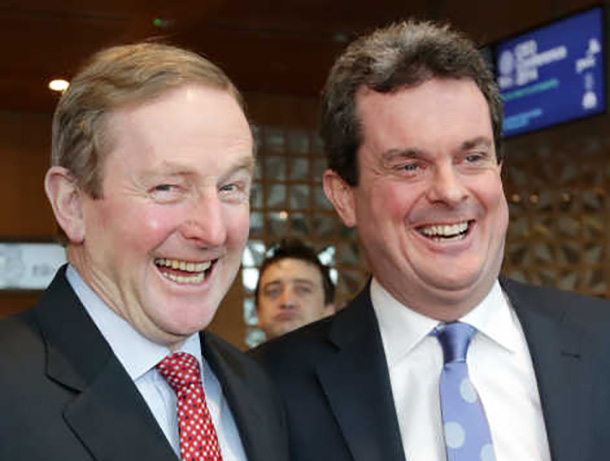
Irish Taoiseach Enda Kenny and PwC (Ireland) Managing Partner Feargal O'Rourke, the "architect" of the Double Irish, who lobbied successfully in 2010 for changes to the Irish withholding tax rules, thus removing the need for a Dutch sandwich.

The Dutch Sandwich is most commonly associated with the Double Irish BEPS tax structure, and Irish-based US technology multinationals such as Google.

The Double Irish is the largest BEPS tool in history, helping mostly US technology and life sciences multinationals shield up to US$100 billion per annum from taxation.

The Double Irish uses an Irish company (IRL2) that is legally incorporated in Ireland, and thus the US tax code regards it as foreign, but is "managed and controlled" from, say, Bermuda (and thus the Irish tax code also regards it as foreign). The Dutch Sandwich, with the Dutch company as the "Dutch slice" in the "sandwich", is used to move money to this Irish company (IRL2), without incurring Irish withholding tax.

In 2013, Bloomberg reported that lobbying by PricewaterhouseCoopers Irish Managing Partner Feargal O'Rourke, who Bloomberg labelled "grand architect" of the Double Irish, led to the Irish Government to relax the rules for making Irish royalty payments to non-EU companies (i.e. IRL2), without incurring Irish withholding tax. This removed the explicit need for the Dutch Sandwich, but there are still several conditions that will not suit all types of Double Irish structures, and thus several US multinationals in Ireland continued with the classic "Double Irish with a Dutch Sandwich" combination.

After pressure from the EU, the Double Irish BEPS tool was closed to new users in 2015, however, new Irish BEPS tools were created to replace it:

- Microsoft's and Allergan's Single Malt Irish BEPS tool;
- Apple's and Accenture's Capital Allowances for Intangible Assets (CAIA) Irish BEPS tool (made famous by leprechaun economics).

== Conduit OFC ==
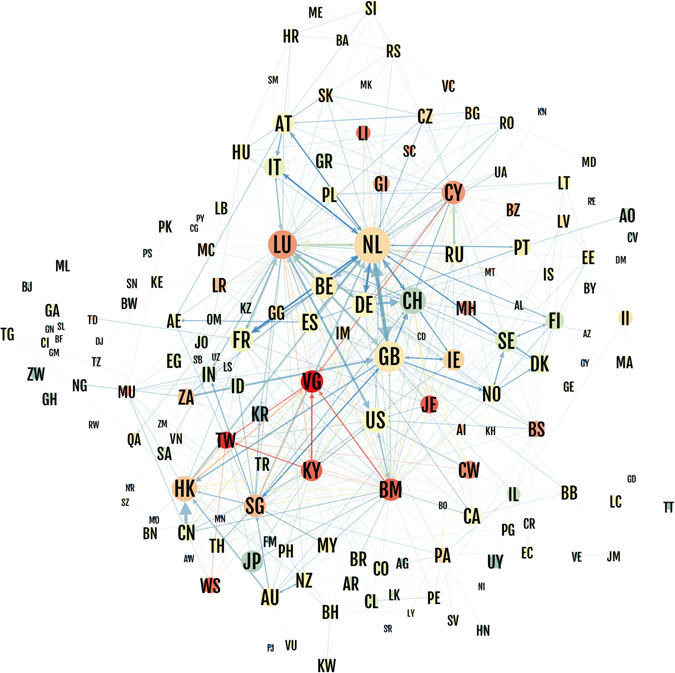
The Dutch Sandwich has helped make the Netherlands the largest global conduit OFC in the world, as it facilitates the movement of EU-sourced profits to non-EU tax-havens

The Dutch Sandwich has made Netherlands the largest of the top five global Conduit OFCs identified in a 2017 analysis published by Nature Research of offshore financial centres titled: "Uncovering Offshore Financial Centers: Conduits and Sinks in the Global Corporate Ownership Network". The five global Conduit OFCs (Netherlands, United Kingdom, Ireland, Singapore, and Switzerland) are countries not formally labeled "tax havens" by the EU/OCED, however, they are responsible for routing almost half the flows global corporate tax avoidance to the twenty-four Sink OFCs, without incurring tax in the Conduit OFC.

Conduit OFCs rely on major offices of large law and accounting firms to create legal vehicles, whereas Sink OFCs have smaller operations (e.g. branches of these larger firms). For example, Ireland has the BEPS tools to enable US IP-heavy multinationals to reroute global profits into Ireland, tax-free. The Netherlands then enables these Irish profits to get to a classical tax haven (e.g. the Cayman Islands or Jersey) without incurring EU withholding tax.

== See also ==
- Tax exporting
- Tax inversion
- Tax haven
- Conduit and sink OFCs
- Bermuda Black Hole
- Irish Financial Services Centre
- Feargal O'Rourke
