= List of foundations established in Vaduz =

Many philanthropic, charitable and other not-for-profit foundations are established in Vaduz, Liechtenstein. Liechtenstein is a minimum-tax state with strict laws to protect the privacy of its foundations. Foundations established in Vaduz are guaranteed the privacy of their assets.

== The list ==
- The Alexander S. Onassis Foundation *1973
- The Olayan Foundation *1983
- The International Lottery in Liechtenstein Foundation
- The International Music and Art Foundation *1988
- The Prince of Liechtenstein Foundation *1970
- The Marcala Foundation
- The Thesaurus Islamicus Foundation
- The European Centre of Austrian Economics Foundation *2004
- The Rothschild-Crutchfield Foundation
- The Inter IKEA Foundation
- The Hilti Family Foundation

== See also ==
- Economy of Liechtenstein
- Tax haven
- Vaduz
