= False tagging theory =

Neuroanatomical theory of belief

The false tagging theory (FTT) is a neuroanatomical model of a belief and doubt process that proposes a single, unique function for the prefrontal cortex. The theory was developed by neuroscientist Erik Asp. Evidence indicates that prefrontal-cortex-mediated doubting is at the core of executive functioning and may explain some biases of intuitive judgment.

FTT asserts that the prefrontal cortex is necessary for false tags during the assessment component of belief. Belief is the existence of perceptual-cognitive representations (PCR) in the post-rolandic regions, whereas doubt, skepticism, and disbelief are mediated by false tags via the prefrontal area. The prefrontal cortex is critical in situations where doubt, uncertainty, and ambiguity are high. Doubt for a specific belief can have a variety of effects, which are often realized as a reduction of behavior toward the belief. Individuals with an altered prefrontal cortex structural integrity should have a “doubt deficit”, a vulnerability to believe inaccurate information.

== Damage to the prefrontal cortex ==
Patients with damage to the prefrontal cortex have a general emotional impairment, often presenting with blunted emotional responses.

The FTT indicates individuals with a disrupted false tagging mechanism will have problems using and experiencing these states, tending to show emotional abnormalities.

=== Psychiatric disease and FTT ===
Investigations into the phenomenology of pathological confabulations have noted that some prefrontal patients only produce temporal order confabulations, that is, real memories out of correct temporal order but other patients produce more fantastic confabulations that are not real memories and tend to have a grandiose quality.

In the case of temporal order confabulations, the patient cannot false tag inaccurate memories only during memory retrieval but can false tag during encoding and normal ruminating; whereas during fantastic confabulations no false tagging for either memory encoding or retrieval can be performed. In fantastic confabulations, the patient has no way to falsify any rumination.

A clinical sign like that of fantastic confabulation is delusion, where patients cannot evaluate the accuracy of their cognitions or perceptions and make incorrect inferences about external reality. Malfunction of the prefrontal cortex is strongly implicated in clinical delusions.

In the FTT, patients with fantastic confabulations or delusions represent errant percepts but fail to false tag the PCR, which results in such patients believing their errant percepts and cognitions.

Schizophrenia is a devastating psychiatric disorder, afflicting about 1% of the world's population. Structural imaging has shown that patients with schizophrenia tend to have prefrontal cortex abnormalities such as reduced gray matter, and functional imaging has revealed that less activation is found in the prefrontal cortex of patients with schizophrenia when challenged with executive function tasks.

=== Developmental evidence ===
The prefrontal cortex in children is preferentially underdeveloped in comparison to other brain regions. Children are often credulous, and skeptical thinking develops relatively late in childhood. Increased skepticism during early development parallels maturation in prefrontal cortex functioning as the prefrontal cortex is relatively underdeveloped early in childhood. The FTT works on the principle of coherence, which states that disbelief results from the comparison of discrepant, mutually incompatible cognitions. A lack of incompatible cognitions in children leaves cognitions believed rather than simply represented without belief or disbelief. The influence of both knowledge and prefrontal cortex development may play complementary roles in the maturation of doubt, but for now, it is the province of future research. Children, compared to adults, should be more gullible and susceptible to inaccurate beliefs.

The structural integrity of the prefrontal cortex in older adults is preferentially diminished relative to other brain regions. The normal age progression results in a decline in frontal lobe function. Therefore, older adults are more vulnerable to inaccurate information, tending to believe without an appropriate level of doubt for a given item of information. There are direct implications for the older adult’s vulnerability to financial fraud, and tendencies to remember false information as true, which influences judgment. Increased credulity during aging is associated with declines in prefrontal cortex functioning. Therefore, age-related declines in the ability of the prefrontal cortex to doubt provide a compelling rationale as to why highly knowledgeable and intelligent adults are often susceptible to deception and fraud.
