= Finance Act 2008 =

Act of the Parliament of the United Kingdom

Finance Act 2008 (Note: Section 166.)
- Act of Parliament
- Parliament of the United Kingdom
- Long title: An Act to grant certain duties, to alter other duties, and to amend the law relating to the National Debt and the Public Revenue, and to make further provision in connection with finance.
- Citation: 2008 c. 9
- Introduced by: Jane Kennedy (Commons)
- Territorial extent: United Kingdom

Dates
- Royal assent: 21 July 2008
- Commencement: 21 July 2008 (Note: Section 4(b) of the Interpretation Act 1978.)
Other legislation
| Amends | National Savings Bank Act 1971; Customs and Excise Management Act 1979; Inheritance Tax Act 1984; Debtors (Scotland) Act 1987; Social Security Administration Act 1992; Social Security Administration (Northern Ireland) Act 1992; Coal Industry Act 1994; Value Added Tax Act 1994; Capital Allowances Act 2001; Railways Act 2005; Tribunals, Courts and Enforcement Act 2007 |
| Amended by | Finance Act 2015 |

Status: Amended

History of passage through Parliament

Text of statute as originally enacted

Revised text of statute as amended

The Finance Act 2008 (c. 9) is an act of the Parliament of the United Kingdom which changes the United Kingdom's tax law as announced in the budget on 12 March 2008 by Chancellor of the Exchequer Alistair Darling. It received royal assent on 21 July 2008, and pursuant to section 1 of the Parliament Act 1911 (1 & 2 Geo. 5. c. 13), the act was not read a third time by the House of Lords.

== See also ==
- Finance Act
- BN66
