= BN66 =

UK Finance Act (2008) - Retrospective Tax legislation

Budget Note 66 (BN66) is the mechanism by which the UK government introduced clause 55 of the Finance Bill 2008, which would later become Section 58 of the Finance Act 2008. This specifically targeted tax planning and tax avoidance schemes that made use of offshore trusts and double taxation treaties to reduce the tax paid by the scheme's users which had previously been legal. This arrangement was originally used by property developers but was then heavily marketed to the freelance community after the introduction of intermediaries legislation known as IR35, because it appeared to offer more certainty concerning tax liabilities than would be the case if running a limited company.

In introducing S58 the government retrospectively changed the law so that not only could these arrangements not operate in future but they were effectively made unlawful from the day they were first introduced.

== Origins of BN66 ==
BN66 has its origins in the result of Padmore vs IRC.

This case challenged the decision of an Inland Revenue Special Commissioner that a UK resident member of an offshore partnership, in this case based in Jersey, should be liable for UK income tax on earnings received from the partnership.

The challenge was based on the premise that under the provisions of a double taxation agreement between the UK and Jersey, the UK taxpayer should be exempt from UK income tax.

The commissioners' decision was based on the opinion that as the taxpayer was neither resident, nor did they carry out business in Jersey, they should not be eligible for relief under dual taxation agreements and were thus liable for full UK income tax on earnings from the partnership.

The judge in the case upheld the appeal on the basis that for the purposes of the arrangement under the double taxation agreement, a partnership was clearly a "body of persons" in the ordinary sense of the words. This partnership was resident in Jersey, since it was managed and controlled there, and its profits were the industrial or commercial profits of a Jersey enterprise exempt from UK tax. Thus the shares of those profits attributable to UK resident partners were also exempt.

This decision was later upheld in the Court of Appeal.

As a result of this the government at the time introduced legislation in the Finance Act (No. 2) 1987 to close this loophole retrospectively, with the exception of Mr Padmore. This meant that UK resident members of foreign partnerships could no longer benefit from double taxation treaties in relation to the profits from those partnerships.

== A change of tactics ==
Following the 1987 legislation new schemes were conceived whereby offshore trusts would be set up with foreign trustees, who would then form partnerships, as opposed to UK resident trustees. UK residents would then be beneficiaries of this trust without being members of the partnership.

In July 2002 HMRC issued a Technical Exchange (Issue 63) advising tax offices that they were aware of several hundred people intending to use such a scheme. However legislation to target these schemes would not be brought in until 2008.

== Budget Note 66 ==
In March 2008, the government announced in its budget that abuse of double taxation agreements would be addressed, and indicated its intention via Budget Note 66 (or BN66 as it is more commonly referred to). This included the changes to be made to clause 55 of the Finance Bill 2008 specifically intended to remove the ability for beneficiaries of foreign trusts to exploit double taxation treaties. At the time of the announcement the government characterised these changes as "clarification" of the law rather than as retrospective changes.

The proposals in BN66 closed the loophole that made these schemes legal. It did this not only prospectively but was also applied with retrospective effect to the legislation passed in 1987, which was in itself retrospective.

The key difference between this change and that applied to the 1987 legislation is that the earlier changes exempted those who would have otherwise been retrospectively caught by the legislation (specifically Mr Padmore).

In the case of section 58 this change was applied without exemption. This meant that many people who had been using tax avoidance schemes in the belief that they were legal in the wake of the Padmore decision and the legislation that followed it, found themselves facing large tax bills due to this retrospective application.

== Implementation ==
On 21 July 2008 the Finance Bill was enacted as the Finance Act 2008, becoming law with effect from that date. The changes introduced as clause 55 of the bill became section 58 of the Act (UK Residents and Foreign Partnerships).

Section 58 amended a number of earlier Acts of Parliament :

- The Income and Corporation Tax Act 1988
- The Taxation of Chargeable Gains Act 1992
- The Income Tax (Trading and Other Income) Act 2005

=== Text of section 58 of the Finance Act 2008 ===
58 UK residents and foreign partnerships.

1. In section 115 of ICTA (partnerships involving companies: supplementary), after subsection (5B) insert—
  “(5C) For the purposes of subsections (5) to (5B) the members of a partnership include any company which is entitled to a share of income or capital gains of the partnership.”
2. In section 59 of TCGA 1992 (partnerships), insert at the end—
  "(4) For the purposes of subsections (2) and (3) the members of a partnership include any person entitled to a share of capital gains of the partnership."
3. In section 858 of ITTOIA 2005 (resident partners and double taxation agreements), insert at the end—
  "(4) For the purposes of this section the members of a firm include any person entitled to a share of income of the firm.”
4. The amendments made by subsections (1) to (3) are treated as always having had effect.
5. For the purposes of the predecessor provisions, the members of a partnership are to be treated as having included, at all times to which those provisions applied, a person entitled to a share of income or capital gains of the partnership.
6. “The predecessor provisions” means—
  (a) section 153(4) and (5) of the Income and Corporation Taxes Act 1970
  (c. 10) (as it had effect under section 62(2) of F(No.2)A 1987), and
  (b) sections 112(4) to (6) and 115(5) of ICTA.

== Retrospection ==
By including S58(4) "The amendments made by subsections (1) to (3) are treated as always having had effect" these changes were effectively made retrospective, rendering any use of avoidance schemes such as those set up after Padmore and the Finance (No. 2) Act 1987 illegal irrespective of the law at the time they were conceived or entered into.

== Legal challenges ==
A number of cases, from various legal angles, have been brought against HMRC contesting the retrospective nature of BN66.

The UK Parliament's Joint Committee on Human Rights (JCHR) has also expressed its concern over the retrospective nature of BN66 and that no adequate justification for such retrospection had been provided.
