= Personal income =

Total earnings of an individual

Daily median income in USD (2021 PPP): 70–100 60–70 50–60 40–50 / 30–40 20–30 10–20 5–10 / 2–5 0–2 No data

In economics, personal income refers to the total earnings of an individual from various sources such as wages, investment ventures, and other sources of income. It encompasses all the products and money received by an individual.

Personal income can be defined in different ways:

- It refers to the income received by individuals or households in a country from all sources during a specific year.
- It includes earned income or transferred income received by households within the country or even from outside sources.
- It represents the total capital an individual receives from various sources over a certain period or throughout their life.

Personal income encompasses various forms of income beyond just wages. It can include dividends, transfers, pension payments, government benefits, and rental income, among others. Taxes charged to an individual are typically not deducted when calculating personal income. Personal income serves as an indicator of the real well-being of people and their ability to afford products or services before taxes are applied. Real income considers inflation and represents the amount of money an individual receives with the effects of inflation considered.

== Types of personal income ==
There are various types of personal income, each serving different purposes and considerations:

- Remuneration: All financial compensations including gross income and employee benefits.
- Gross income: This refers to the amount of money an individual receives before any payroll taxes and mandatory payments.
- Disposable income: Disposable income is the amount of money an individual has available to use after all taxes and mandatory payments have been deducted. It reflects the actual funds at the individual's disposal for spending, saving, or investing.

Personal income can be categorized based on its source:

- Earned income: Earned income is the money an individual receives as direct payment for work or services rendered. It includes wages, salaries, and other compensation earned through active employment.
- Portfolio income: Portfolio income is derived from selling assets, and it represents the difference between the selling price of an asset and the price at which it was originally purchased.
- Passive income: Passive income is money received without significant active effort or involvement from the recipient. It includes income from sources such as rental properties, royalties from intellectual property, and some types of business income.
- Non-passive income: Non-passive income requires an individual's material participation but is not classified as earned income. This typically includes income from business ownership when the individual actively participates in the business's operations.

== The relationship between socio-economic and the personal income ==
In recent decades, there has been a growing concern about the economy of personal and household income, viewed as a socio-economic unit that binds individuals through relationships that emerge when organizing their shared lives. Simultaneously, it is also an economic entity that governs the consumption of goods produced in the economy and provides the social economy with available resources.

The socio-economic significance of personal income has become particularly pronounced in recent years, coinciding with the development of consumer credit. According to E. A. Maznaya, the household should be regarded as a system of economic relations between individuals and society and among people who pool their budgets and collectively make decisions. Individuals form these economic relations to meet their needs and sustain their living conditions.

=== Households and personal income aspects ===
Personal income, which encompasses household and family finances, pertains to the economic relationship involved in generating and utilizing monetary resources to ensure the material and social well-being of society members and their continued existence. In the context of developed market relations, personal finance is recognized as an independent component of the financial system.

Numerous publications have extensively examined this subject, addressing various aspects such as effective management and control of personal expenses using budgets and accounts, strategic allocation of consumption expenditures, planning for taxes, insurance payments, medical care, and debt repayment, as well as income management and strategies for accumulating assets and planning for retirement. Other important aspects include making informed decisions regarding purchases and borrowing, budgeting for child-rearing, education, insurance, and more.

=== The difference in personal income and National income ===
Personal income is a component of national income that households receive and derive from production. National income is generated by these production aspects. Personal income refers to the money received by factors of production, whereas national income represents the income generated by these factors.

The income of the government sector is considered as part of national income but not included in personal income calculations. Additionally, certain components, such as companies' undistributed profits and corporate profit taxes, are accounted for in national income but must be excluded from personal income calculations. Conversely, windfall gains, which are not part of national income, are included in personal income. Furthermore, interest on the national debt is considered in personal income but not in national income.

==== Personal income calculation ====
The formula for calculating Personal Income (PI) can be expressed as follows:

PI = National Income - Undistributed profits (UP) - Corporate tax (CT) - Net interest households payment (NIH) - social security contribution + Transfer payment from households (TPH) + interest of public debt + windfall gain

In this formula:

- Undistributed profits (UP) represent the earnings that are not distributed among shareholders and are retained by the company.
- Corporate tax (CT) refers to the taxes paid by corporations to the government.
- Net interest households payment (NIH) represents the interest payments made by households.
- Transfer payment from households (TPH) refers to payments received by households from sources such as government assistance or other entities.

== Size distribution of income ==
The most common way to measure income inequality in economics is to arrange individuals or households in ascending order of incomes and divide them into distinct groups, such as quintiles or deciles. This allows for a clear assessment of income distribution within different groups and helps identify underlying causes and effects.

One popular measure used to visualize income inequality is the Kuznets ratio, which compares the share of total income received by the top 20% of the population to that received by the bottom 40%. This ratio helps gauge the inequality between high and low-income groups within a society.

Another common approach is constructing a Lorenz Curve, a graphical representation of the cumulative percentages of income recipients. The curve compares the actual income distribution to perfect equality (represented by a diagonal line) and perfect inequality (where one person receives 100% of the income). The area between the Lorenz Curve and the diagonal line calculates the Gini coefficient, which ranges from 0 to 1. A higher Gini coefficient indicates higher income inequality, with 1 representing perfect inequality.

The Gini coefficient is widely used because it satisfies important properties that allow for easy comparison of income inequality between different countries. It is considered a simple yet informative measure for evaluating income distribution within societies.

As of 2021, Costa Rica has the highest Gini coefficient among OECD countries at 0.479, while the Slovak Republic has the lowest at 0.236. Globally, South Africa has the highest Gini coefficient at 0.63, attributed to various factors such as historical apartheid, high unemployment, underdeveloped education, and significant population growth.

The Gini coefficient provides a "country-wide" overview of income inequality and does not account for factors like location or occupational sources of income. Critics also point out that it disregards household size and the different needs of households, such as raising children or providing for retirement. Other measures, like the Atkinson index or the Theil index, have been proposed to address some of these limitations but have their own subjective parameters, making them less scientific. Economist Amartya Sen advocates for a broader evaluation of human welfare beyond income, emphasizing capabilities and functionings as important considerations.

== Sources of personal income ==
Personal income can be categorized into various types, including wages, rent, interest, profit, proprietor's income, and transfer payments. While many people commonly associate personal income with wages and salaries, there are several other sources that contribute to an individual's total income.

1. Wages/Salaries: This category includes earnings from labor income, such as regular wages and salaries. It constitutes approximately 60% of an individual's income and is an essential component of the national income and product accounts.
2. Rent: Rental income earned by individuals from properties they own, such as homes, land, or equipment, is considered part of personal income. Rent accounts for about 2% to 3% of total personal income.
3. Interest: Interest income is generated from bank accounts, bonds, loans, and other fixed-income instruments. It contributes approximately 10% to 13% of personal income.
4. Profit: Profit represents the share of a company's capital that belongs to entrepreneurs. In the personal income formula, dividends are used to account for profit. Dividends typically make up 2% to 4% of personal income. Additionally, two types of business profit are not distributed: retained earnings and corporate taxes on gains.
5. Profits of the Proprietor: Owners of sole proprietorships and partnerships do not receive wages or salaries; instead, they receive a percentage of the business's profits, known as proprietor's income. This type of income makes up about 10% of personal income.
6. Transfer Payments: Transfer payments account for approximately 15% to 20% of personal income. These are income sources that individuals receive but are not generated through factors of production. Examples of transfer payments include social security benefits, welfare payments, and unemployment compensation.

A second method of calculating personal income involves adjusting the National Income by considering earned but unpaid income and received but not earned income:

PI = NI + Earned but Unpaid Income + Received but not Earned Income

1. Earned but Unpaid Income: This category includes undistributed profits, social security taxes, and corporate taxes. Undistributed profits represent the portion of a business's revenues reserved for future business prospects, while social security taxes are contributions made by workers. Businesses pay corporate taxes on their profits.
2. Received but not Earned Income: Social security benefits, unemployment benefits, and welfare payments are examples of income that individuals receive but do not earn. The government provides these payments to support various household members, such as retirees, disabled individuals, and the unemployed.

== Importance of personal income ==
Personal income significantly affects an individual's well-being and living conditions. A higher personal income generally indicates higher welfare and better living standards for the average person. As a result, individuals often seek ways to increase their income to afford more goods and improve their overall quality of life.

Increasing personal income can lead to greater happiness. However, although rising income has been linked to improved moods and life assessments, it is not the sole determinant of happiness. Other factors, such as social connections, health, and personal fulfillment, also play crucial roles in overall well-being.

== Personal income tax ==
Personal income tax is a tax levied on income earned by individuals, and its rates are adjusted according to the jurisdiction of each country. It serves as a significant source of revenue for the government, which is then utilized for funding public goods and services.

The personal income tax is generally considered the most progressive tax, meaning that higher-income individuals are taxed at higher rates compared to lower-income individuals. However, there are variations in tax systems across countries, with some taxes like social security contributions, consumption taxes, and real estate taxes being regressive in many places. Additionally, tax expenditures associated with personal income tax tend to benefit wealthier individuals, with in-work tax credits being a primary exception.

Over time, personal income tax schedules have changed, leading to flatter tax rates and increased progressivity in some countries. Various countries have implemented measures to make the tax system more attractive for low-income groups and spouses, thereby increasing the overall progressivity of the personal income tax. The role of personal income tax in the total tax revenue differs across countries, and its progressivity is relatively limited compared to other taxes like social security contributions.

Wages and employment influence tax revenues from personal income tax, and they are affected by social-related expenditures. Tax expenditures have been utilized as tools to promote social and economic objectives, with preferential treatments in housing, pensions, education, and health expenses being among the areas targeted.

In the United States, social tax expenditures significantly impact personal income taxation, making up a substantial portion of total tax expenditure as a percentage of GDP. Countries across the OECD have experienced changes in tax wedge rates, particularly in those with higher incomes. In France, for instance, the rise in personal income taxes as a percentage of labor costs was influenced by an increase in surtax rates, but this was partly offset by reduced social security contributions.

== Taxable vs. Non-taxable income ==
Almost all types of income in the United States are considered taxable by the IRS. However, there are some specific circumstances where certain revenue streams are not subject to taxation. For example, if an individual is a member of a religious order and has taken a poverty vow, works for an organization managed by that order, and has donated earnings to the order, the individual's income may be considered non-taxable.

Similarly, the value of an employee achievement award may not be taxed as long as certain conditions are met. Additionally, if an individual receives a life insurance payment after the passing of a loved one, that payment is generally considered non-taxable income.

Taxable and non-taxable income can be defined differently by different taxing authorities. For instance, while the United States IRS considers lottery winnings taxable income, the Canada Revenue Agency may consider most lottery prizes and other one-time windfalls non-taxable. The tax treatment of various income sources may vary depending on the country and its tax regulations.

== See also ==
- Personal income in the United States
- Economic reports
- List of countries by average wage
- List of countries by GNI per capita growth
