= Kakwani index =

The Kakwani index is a measure of the progressivity of a social intervention, and is used by social scientists, statisticians, and economists. It is named after the economist who first proposed and used it, Nanak Chand Kakwani.

The Kakwani index uses the Gini framework to measure how progressive a social intervention is. It is equal to the difference between the Gini index for the social intervention, and the Gini index for incomes before imposition of the policy intervention. Theoretically, the Kakwani index can vary between −1 and 1; the larger the index is, the more progressive is the social intervention.

The index is calculated using the following formula:

$$K_t = \frac{2}{n}\sum^n_{k=1} \bigg(\frac{k}{n} - \sum_{i=1}^k \gamma_i\bigg) - G_{beforetax},$$

where $i = 1, . . ., k$ denotes individual $i$, $n$ is the total number of individuals in society, $\gamma_i$ is the share of total taxes paid by individual $i$, and $G_{beforetax}$ is the before-tax Gini coefficient. Using the formula for the Gini coefficient, the equation for the Kakwani index can be reduced to:

$$K_t=\frac{2}{n} \sum_{k=1}^n \sum_{i=1}^k (\alpha_i - \gamma_i),$$

where $\alpha_i$ denotes the share of income received by individual $i$.

The Kakwani index was originally devised to measure the progressivity of tax systems, in which case, it would be equal to the Gini concentration index for the taxes collected minus the Gini index for pre-tax incomes. This can be shown to be equal to the absolute decline in the Gini index for incomes, caused by the imposition of taxation, divided by the average net rate of taxes.

The Kakwani index is also commonly used to examine the equity of government health care provision. In that situation, the Kakwani index would be equal to the difference between the Gini coefficient for incomes and the Gini concentration index for out‐of‐pocket health care payments.

== See also ==
- Suits index
