= Pigou–Dalton principle =

The Pigou–Dalton principle (PDP) is a principle in welfare economics, particularly in cardinal welfarism. Named after Arthur Cecil Pigou and Hugh Dalton, it is a condition on social welfare functions. It says that, all other things being equal, a social welfare function should prefer allocations that are more equitable. In other words, a transfer of some defined variable (for example utility or income) from the rich to the poor is desirable, as long as it does not bring the rich to a poorer situation than the poor.

Formally, let $u=(u_1,u_2,\dots,u_n)$ and $u'=(u'_1,u'_2,\dots,u'_n)$ be two utility profiles. Suppose that at the first profile:

$$u_1<u_2$$

and at the second profile:

$u_1'+u_2' = u_1+u_2$ and
$u'_3=u_3, u'_4=u_4,\dots,u'_n=u_n$ and
$u_1 < u_1' < u_2$ and $u_1 < u_2' < u_2$

(so $u_1 < u_1' < u_2' < u_2$ or $u_1 < u_1' = u_2' < u_2$ or $u_1 < u_2' < u_1' < u_2$)

Then, the social-welfare ordering should weakly prefer the second profile $u'$, since it reduces the inequality between agent 1 and agent 2 (and may switch which is richer), while keeping unchanged the sum of their utilities and the utilities of all other agents.

PDP was suggested by Arthur Cecil Pigou and developed by Hugh Dalton (see, e.g., Amartya Sen, 1973 or Herve Moulin, 2004).

== Examples ==
- The egalitarian function: $W(u) = \min(u_1,u_2)$ satisfies PDP in a strong sense: when utility is transferred from the rich to the poor, the value of $W$ strictly increases.
- The utilitarian function: $W(u) = u_1 + u_2$ satisfies PDP in a weak sense: when utility is transferred from the rich to the poor, the value of $W$ does not increase, but also does not decrease.
- The function $W(u) = u_1^2 + u_2^2$ violates PDP: when utility is transferred from the rich to the poor, the value of $W$ strictly decreases.
- The Atkinson Index and the related generalized entropy index satisfy the principle - any transfer from someone relatively poorer to someone relatively richer will increase inequality as measured by the index. For the Atkinson index, this holds when the inequality aversion parameter is nonnegative, which is the defining case.
