= Gabriel Palma =

Chilean economist and professor

Gabriel Palma (José Gabriel Palma) is a Chilean development economist. He is an emeritus professor at the University of Cambridge and a part-time professor at the University of Santiago, Chile. He is most noted for his work on dependency theory, the political economy of development in Latin America, and income distribution. He is also known for the Palma ratio, which is defined as the ratio of the richest 10% of the population's share of gross national income divided by the poorest 40%'s share. This is based on Palma's finding that middle-class incomes almost always represent about half of gross national income. In contrast, the other half is split between the richest 10% and the poorest 40%, but the share of those two groups varies considerably across countries.

Palma gave the 2020 Amartya Sen Lecture, for the Human Development and Capability Association (HDCA) Conference on What Went Wrong With European Social Democracy: On Building a Debilitating Capitalism, Where Even the Welfare State Subsidises Greater Market Inequality.

== Selected publications ==
- Palma, G. (1978). Dependency: a formal theory of underdevelopment or a methodology for the analysis of concrete situations of underdevelopment?. World development, 6(7–8), 881–924.
- Palma, J. G., & Stiglitz, J. E. (2016). Do nations just get the inequality they deserve? The “Palma Ratio” re-examined. In Inequality and Growth: Patterns and Policy: Volume II: Regions and Regularities (pp. 35–97). London: Palgrave Macmillan UK.
- Palma, G. (1998). Three and a half cycles of ‘mania, panic, and [asymmetric] crash’: East Asia and Latin America compared. Cambridge Journal of Economics, 22(6), 789–808.
- Palma, J. G. (2011). Homogeneous middles vs. heterogeneous tails, and the end of the ‘inverted‐U’: It's all about the share of the rich. Development and Change, 42(1), 87–153.
- Chang, H. J., Palma, G., & Whittaker, D. H. (1998). The Asian crisis: introduction. Cambridge Journal of Economics, 22(6), 649–652.
- Arestis, P., Palma, G., & Sawyer, M. (Eds.). (2005). Capital Controversy, Post Keynesian Economics and the History of Economic Thought: Essays in Honour of Geoff Harcourt, Volume One (Vol. 1). Routledge.
