= Elephant curve =

Graph showing unequal income growth

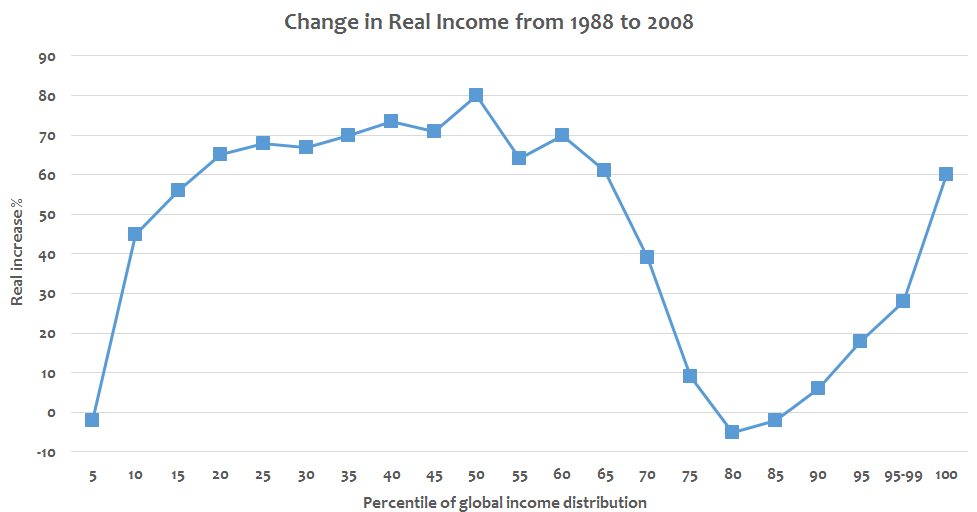
Global changes in real income by income percentile - v1

The elephant curve, also known as the Lakner-Milanovic graph or the global growth incidence curve, is a graph that illustrates the unequal distribution of income growth for individuals belonging to different income groups. The original graph was published in 2013 and illustrates the change in income growth that occurred from 1988 to 2008. The x axis of the graph shows the percentiles of the global income distribution. The y axis shows the cumulative growth rate percentage of income. The main conclusion that can be drawn from the graph is that the global top 1% experienced around a 60% increase in income, whereas the income of the global middle increased 70 to 80%.

== History ==
The graph was first published by Christoph Lakner and Branko Milanovic in 2013 as part of a larger article called "Global Income Distribution: From the Fall of the Berlin Wall to the Great Recession". Lakner and Milanovic sought to improve the study of global income inequality by creating a database of information about income from national household surveys. From this information, they created a number of graphs to illustrate their findings, one of which they called the GICs, or growth incidence curves. Lakner and Milanovic created growth incidence curves for different regions and for different time periods, but the graph that is most well known was called the global growth incidence curve. They stated that the function of this curve was to show how globalization positively or negatively affected the global distribution of income growth. Lanker and Milanovic initially referred to this graph as the global growth incidence curve, but it would later come to be known as the elephant curve. Lakner and Milanovic described the global growth incidence curve as "a distinct supine S shape, with gains at the very top and one in the middle".

== Description ==
The elephant curve was named for its resemblance to the side profile of an elephant's body. The start of the line, representing the bottom 10% of the population begins low on the y-axis and then steeply rises upward, representing the tail of the elephant. From there until the 50th percentile the line curves upward, representing the torso of the elephant. From 50% to 60% there is a sharp spike in the line, representing the elephant's head. From 60% to 80% there is a sharp downward curve, resembling the downward slope of the elephant's trunk. From 80% to 100% there is an upward curve, representing the upward curve of an elephant's trunk. There is also a notably sharp upward movement from 99% to 100% section of the trunk. The original graph also had a horizontal line at 24.34%, representing the global mean growth rate of income during this time.

There are four main conclusions that can be drawn from the elephant curve in relation to globalization's effect on income inequality. Beginning with the tail portion of the graph, in the past two decades the very poorest citizens of the world have experienced almost no benefits from the rise of globalization. This reflects the low growth that has occurred in the poorest countries, specifically countries in Sub-Saharan Africa. The middle section of the graph, from the 10th percentile to the 50th percentile, represents the global middle class. The growth that occurs in this section of the population reflects the fast economic growth of many countries that were once considered "developing countries" such as China or India. The sharp downward curve that resembles the downward slope of the elephant's trunk represents the global upper-middle class, corresponding to the working and middle class of richer countries. This class has experienced little to no growth in wages during the globalization in the years between 1988 and 2008. Lastly, the upward sloping part of the graph that resembles the tip of the elephant's trunk represents the global elites who have experienced tremendous growth as a result of the globalization of the aforementioned years. Of these global elites, those belonging to the top 1% have had a notable increase in income growth, which has led many, including the creators of the graph, to deem the top 1% as the "winners" of income growth due to globalization.

== Notable adaptations ==
Since the elephant curve's creation in 2013, there have been a number of adapted versions that have been created to illustrate the global income inequality through different methods. One adaptation was created in 2018 by Alvaredo Facundo, Lucas Chancel, Thomas Piketty, Emmanuel Saez, and Gabriel Zucman. Their elephant graph differed from the Lakner-Milanovic graph in two major ways. First, this version of the curve utilized inequality statistics from the World Inequality Database instead of information from household surveys. They believed that surveys do a poor job of capturing the true income of wealthy individuals and that they are not uniform across different nations and that the estimates from the World Inequality Database would rectify these concerns. The second change from the original model was that this adaptation would analyze data from 1980 to 2016 instead of from 1988 to 2008. Similar to the original graph, the reason behind choosing these years to analyze is mainly due to data availability. The main conclusion that was drawn from this version of the elephant curve was that in recent decades, the top 1% of the global population has experienced twice as much growth in income compared to the bottom 50%.

== Causes of the elephant curve ==
In the late 1800s and early 1900s, there was a transition from agricultural work in rural areas to private sector work in urban areas. This period of urbanization caused inequality to rise to its maximum level at the beginning of the transition and then slowly decline to its lowest level at the end of the transition period. Inequality grew because the ones moving to the private sector would become wealthier in the city with a private-sector job, while the agricultural sector stayed stagnant. Once the transition was over, inequality was at its lowest because the final stages of growth were complete and everyone was sharing in the wealth generated.

Inequality steadily declined between 1937 and 1944 and then stayed stable from the 1950s through the 1970s. This stability was reached because of the first and second world wars, large taxes on the rich to finance the wars, the emergence of socialist movements and trade unions, the massive scale-up of public education, and the greater participation of women in the workforce. This period of time has been named the "Great Leveling in the Rich World" because inequality was either stagnant or falling during this period. The two world wars were very big factors in keeping inequality low at the time. The rich were being heavily taxed by governments to finance the two conflicts, lowering inequality. After the wars, more socialist movements and trade unions emerged demanding better pay and working conditions, giving workers more power and lowering inequality. The massive scale-up in public education offered many more opportunities for students to get better jobs. The better educated would get better-paying jobs, decreasing inequality for many. Lastly, the greater participation of women in the workforce allowed women to work more and generate their own wealth.

In the 1970s inequality changed course and started to increase in many places throughout the world. The abolishment of progressive taxation in the United States, Thatcher's policies in the United Kingdom, and the transformation of the Soviet Union all play a part in the rise in inequality during this period. In Russia, the top elites had extreme growth rates while the bottom 50% incomes fell. This reflects the shift away from the communist system in Russia, toward a market economy which does not constrain the incomes of the top elites. We have seen rising inequality since the 1970s and in the "rich world", and economists predict that this trend will continue. In advanced stages of growth, inequality rates continue to rise to record high levels. As a country develops, its top 1% gets richer as the rest of the population stays relatively stagnant. The elites are receiving all of the benefits of growth while the general population receives few benefits.

=== The Global North versus the Global South ===
The idea of economic development, as it describes the movement of a population towards a higher standard of living, began with Western Europe's industrialization during the 18th century however, scholars only began to analyze the difference in development between different countries after World War II. The analysis of the difference in development between the world's countries led to the understanding that there are two global economies, one being the economy of the Global North, and the other being the economy of the Global South. The Global North describes wealthier and more "economically developed" countries, such as those found in Europe and North America.

In contrast, the Global South describes the countries that have historically been classified as underdeveloped such as India, China, Brazil, Mexico and countries in Africa. While wealth and income inequality is a challenge for countries in both the Global North and the Global South, the elephant curve provides a good representation of the differences in income inequality between these countries. One important point that is not fully captured in the elephant curve is that because the citizens of the Global North initially had a larger portion of the world's wealth compared to citizens of the Global South, income inequality has affected the countries in differing ways, as can be seen in the aforementioned segments of the graph. Historically, the countries of the Global North have economically exploited the countries of the Global South, which has had a lasting impact on the wealth disparities that can be seen between the countries today. The elephant curve represents the way in which this exploitation is having an effect on those countries in the Global South today, such as the low growth that is occurring in many countries in Africa that are still economically disadvantaged due to the legacy of colonialism by countries of the Global North.

== Sections of the curve ==
=== Bottom 50% ===
The elephant curve shows the bottom 15% of the population has very little income growth. The bottom 15% are the poorest people in the poorest countries. They are not presented with many opportunities to grow and obtain wealth simply because of their situation. There are little to no opportunities for them to generate wealth, so their income stays relatively stagnant, however, if they do get the opportunity, they can increase their wealth by a large amount. These people hardly feel the benefits of globalization because they do not have the wealth to participate in the global economy. From 15% to around 50% generally represents the lower and middle classes in developed countries. The income growth is small from 15% to 20% and gradually increases to around 40%. This is because of the opportunities in developed countries. The lower and middle classes have the ability to increase their wealth through better work and other opportunities that people in undeveloped countries don't have access to. It has been shown that the higher the top 10% share, the lower the bottom 50% share will be. As the top elites grow their wealth, it is at the cost of the lower and middle classes.

=== Middle 40% ===
In Alvaredo et al.'s reinvention of the elephant curve, the global middle 40% income bracket had a 43% income growth from 1980 to 2016. (See in comparison to the Top 9% and Top 1%)

=== Top 10% ===
In Alvaredo et al.'s reinvention of the elephant curve, the global top 10% income bracket had a 70% income growth from 1980 to 2016. (See in comparison to the Middle 40%, and Top 1%). The income of the top 10% mainly comes from sources such as profits, dividends, or rent, rather than wages like the lower income brackets. Consequently, when the top 10% decreases wages, it increases their own profits, and decreases the income of those in lower brackets; they have an inverse relationship.

=== The 1% ===
In Alvaredo et al.'s reinvention of the elephant curve, the 1% income bracket had a 101% income growth from 1980 to 2016. Additionally, the top 0.001% had an income growth rate of 235% globally. (See in comparison to the Middle 40%, and Top 9%). It is expected that in the next 30 years the global top 1%'s global income share will increase by roughly 25% while the bottom 50% will only increase by roughly 9%. This means that the top 1% is earning more than double that of the middle 40%, hence, the entire 1% possess more than double the wealth and income than the entire middle 40-50% combined, a group that is roughly 50x larger. Unfortunately, most economic studies indicate that there is no room for change in these rates of inequality in the next 30 years. The Reagan-Thatcher revolution (see Reaganism and Thatcherism) along with the deregulation of China and India are what allowed for the economic explosion of the 1%. This illustrates the point that "policies and institutions matter [...] rising inequality cannot be viewed as a mechanical, deterministic consequence of globalization or technological change, as most economic models assume".

== Other notable measures of inequality ==
=== Gini index ===
The Gini index is a common measure of income inequality. For a country (city, state, etc.), the Gini index can range from 0 to 1. Perfect equality would equal 0 and perfect inequality would equal 1. It is calculated based on the difference between the lorenz curve and the value of perfect income equality distribution.

=== Lorenz curve ===
The Lorenz curve is a visual representation of income inequality commonly used by economists. It is graphed by plotting the Cumulative Percent of the Population on the x-axis vs the Cumulative Proportion of Income on the y-axis.

== See also ==
- Median income
