= Mean log deviation =

Measure of income inequality

In statistics and econometrics, the mean log deviation (MLD) is a measure of income inequality. The MLD is zero when everyone has the same income, and takes larger positive values as incomes become more unequal, especially at the high end.

== Definition ==
The MLD of household income has been defined as

$$\mathrm{MLD}=\frac{1}{N}\sum_{i=1}^N \ln \frac{\overline{x}}{x_i}$$

where N is the number of households, $x_i$ is the income of household i, and $\overline{x}$ is the mean of $x_i$. Naturally the same formula can be used for positive variables other than income and for units of observation other than households.

Equivalent definitions are

$$\mathrm{MLD}=\frac{1}{N}\sum_{i=1}^N (\ln \overline{x} - \ln x_i)
=\ln \overline{x} - \overline{\ln x}$$

where $\overline{\ln x}$ is the mean of ln(x). The last definition shows that MLD is nonnegative, since $\ln{\overline{x}} \geq \overline{\ln x}$ by Jensen's inequality.

MLD has been called "the standard deviation of ln(x)", (SDL) but this is not correct. The SDL is

$$\mathrm{SDL}
=\sqrt{\frac{1}{N}\sum_{i=1}^N (\ln x_i - \overline{\ln x})^2}$$

and this is not equal to the MLD.

In particular, if a random variable $X$ follows a log-normal distribution with mean and standard deviation of $\log(X)$ being $\mu$ and $\sigma$, respectively, then

$$EX = \exp\{\mu + \sigma^2/2\}.$$

Thus, asymptotically, MLD converges to:

$$\ln\{\exp[\mu + \sigma^2/2]\} - \mu = \sigma^2/2$$

For the standard log-normal, SDL converges to 1 while MLD converges to 1/2.

== Related statistics ==
The MLD is a special case of the generalized entropy index. Specifically, the MLD is the generalized entropy index with α=0.
