= Atkinson index =

Inequality measure

The Atkinson index (also known as the Atkinson measure or Atkinson inequality measure) is a measure of income inequality developed by British economist Anthony Barnes Atkinson. The measure is useful in determining which end of the distribution contributed most to the observed inequality.

== Definition ==
The Atkinson index is defined as:

$$A_\varepsilon(y_1,\ldots,y_N)=
\begin{cases}
1-\frac{1}{\mu}\left(\frac{1}{N}\sum_{i=1}^{N}y_{i}^{1-\varepsilon}\right)^{1/(1-\varepsilon)}
& \mbox{for}\ 0 \leq \varepsilon \neq 1 \\
1-\frac{1}{\mu}\left(\prod_{i=1}^{N}y_{i}\right)^{1/N}
& \mbox{for}\ \varepsilon=1 \\
1-\frac{1}{\mu}\min \left(y_1,...,y_N\right)
& \mbox{for}\ \varepsilon=+\infty
\end{cases}$$

where $y_{i}$ is individual income (i = 1, 2, ..., N) and $\mu$ is the mean income.

In other words, the Atkinson index is the complement to 1 of the ratio of the Hölder generalized mean of exponent 1−ε to the arithmetic mean of the incomes (where as usual the generalized mean of exponent 0 is interpreted as the geometric mean).

== Interpretation ==
The index can be turned into a normative measure by imposing a coefficient $\varepsilon$ to weight incomes. Greater weight can be placed on changes in a given portion of the income distribution by choosing $\varepsilon$, the level of "inequality aversion", appropriately. The Atkinson index becomes more sensitive to changes at the lower end of the income distribution as $\varepsilon$ increases. Conversely, as the level of inequality aversion falls (that is, as $\varepsilon$ approaches 0) the Atkinson becomes less sensitive to changes in the lower end of the distribution. The Atkinson index is for no value of $\varepsilon$ highly sensitive to top incomes because of the common restriction that $\varepsilon$ is nonnegative.

The Atkinson $\varepsilon$ parameter is often called the "inequality aversion parameter", since it regulates the sensitivity of the implied social welfare losses from inequality to income inequality as measured by some corresponding generalised entropy index. The Atkinson index is defined in reference to a corresponding social welfare function, where mean income multiplied by one minus the Atkinson index gives the welfare equivalent equally distributed income. Thus the Atkinson index gives the share of current income which could be sacrificed, without reducing social welfare, if perfect inequality were instated. For $\varepsilon=0$, (no aversion to inequality), the marginal social welfare from income is invariant to income, i.e. marginal increases in income produce as much social welfare whether they go to a poor or rich individual. In this case, the welfare equivalent equally distributed income is equal to mean income, and the Atkinson index is zero.

For $\varepsilon=+\infty$ (infinite aversion to inequality) the marginal social welfare of income of the poorest individual is infinitely larger than any even slightly richer individual, and the Atkinson social welfare function is equal to the smallest income in the sample. In this case, the Atkinson index is equal to mean income minus the smallest income, divided by mean income. As in large typical income distributions incomes of zero or near zero are common, the Atkinson index will tend to be one or very close to one for very large $\varepsilon$.

The Atkinson index then varies between 0 and 1 and is a measure of the amount of social utility to be gained by complete redistribution of a given income distribution, for a given $\varepsilon$ parameter. Under the utilitarian ethical standard and some restrictive assumptions (a homogeneous population and constant elasticity of substitution utility), $\varepsilon$ is equal to the income elasticity of marginal utility of income.

== Relationship to generalized entropy index ==
The Atkinson index with inequality aversion $\varepsilon$ is equivalent (under a monotonic rescaling) to a generalized entropy index with parameter $\alpha = 1 - \varepsilon$

The formula for deriving an Atkinson index with inequality aversion parameter $\epsilon$ from the corresponding GE index under the restriction $\varepsilon = 1-\alpha$ is given by:
$$A=1-[\varepsilon(\varepsilon-1)GE(\alpha) + 1]^{(1/(1-\varepsilon))} \qquad \varepsilon\ne1$$
$$A= 1-e^{-GE(\alpha)} \qquad \varepsilon=1$$

== Properties ==
The Atkinson index satisfies the following properties:

1. The index is symmetric in its arguments: $A_\varepsilon(y_1,\ldots,y_N)=A_\varepsilon(y_{\sigma(1)},\ldots,y_{\sigma(N)})$ for any permutation $\sigma$.
2. The index is non-negative, and is equal to zero only if all incomes are the same: $A_\varepsilon(y_1,\ldots,y_N) = 0$ iff $y_i = \mu$ for all $i$.
3. The index satisfies the principle of transfers: if a transfer $\Delta>0$ is made from an individual with income $y_i$ to another one with income $y_j$ such that $y_i - \Delta > y_j + \Delta$, then the inequality index cannot increase.
4. The index satisfies population replication axiom: if a new population is formed by replicating the existing population an arbitrary number of times, the inequality remains the same: $A_\varepsilon(\{y_1,\ldots,y_N\},\ldots,\{y_1,\ldots,y_N\})=A_\varepsilon(y_1,\ldots,y_N)$
5. The index satisfies mean independence, or income homogeneity, axiom: if all incomes are multiplied by a positive constant, the inequality remains the same: $A_\varepsilon(y_1,\ldots,y_N) = A_\varepsilon( ky_1,\ldots,ky_N)$ for any $k>0$.
6. The index is (non-additively) subgroup decomposable and the corresponding generalized entropy index is additively subgroup decomposable. This means that overall inequality in the population can be computed as the sum of the corresponding GE indices within each group, and the GE index of the group mean incomes:

$$GE(\alpha; y_{gi}: g=1,\ldots,G, i=1,\ldots,N_g) = \sum_{g=1}^G w_g GE(\alpha; y_{g1}, \ldots, y_{gN_g}) + GE(\alpha; \mu_1, \ldots, \mu_G)$$

where $g$ indexes groups, $i$, individuals within groups, $\mu_g$ is the mean income in group $g$, and the weights $w_g$ depend on $\mu_g, \mu, N$ and $N_g$. The class of the additively-decomposable inequality indices is very restrictive; in fact, only the generalized entropy indices are additively decomposable. Many popular indices, including Gini index, do not satisfy this property.

== See also ==
- Income inequality metrics
- Generalized entropy index
- Gini index
