= Suits index =

Measure of tax progressiveness

The Suits index of a public policy is a measure of tax progressiveness, named for economist Daniel B. Suits. Similar to the Gini coefficient, the Suits index is calculated by comparing the area under the Lorenz curve to the area under a proportional line. For a progressive tax (for example, where higher income tax units pay a greater fraction of their income as tax), the Suits index is positive. A proportional tax (for example, where each unit pays an equal fraction of income) has a Suits index of zero, and a regressive tax (for example, where lower income tax units pay a greater fraction of income in tax) has a negative Suits index. A theoretical tax where the richest person pays all the tax has a Suits index of 1, and a tax where the poorest person pays everything has a Suits index of −1. Tax preferences (credits and deductions) also have a Suits index.

== Types of tax ==
=== Income tax ===
By definition, a flat income tax has a Suits index of zero. However, almost all income tax systems allow for some amount of income to be earned without tax (an exemption amount) to avoid collecting tax from very low income units. Also, most income tax systems provide for higher marginal tax rates at higher income. These effects combine to make income taxes generally progressive, and therefore have a positive Suits index.

=== Sales tax ===
Sales taxes are generally charged on each purchase, with no low income exemption. Additionally, lower income tax units generally spend a greater proportion of income on taxable purchases, while higher income units will save or invest a larger part of income. Therefore, sales taxes are generally regressive, and have a negative Suits index.

=== Excise taxes ===
Excise taxes are typically charged on items like gasoline, alcohol or tobacco products. Since the tax rate is typically high, and there is a practical limit to the amount of product that can be consumed, this tax is generally more regressive and has a very negative Suits index.

== Properties ==
The Suits index has the useful property that the total Suits index of a group of taxes or policies is the revenue-weighted sum of the individual indexes. The Suits index is also related closely to the Gini coefficient. While a Gini coefficient of zero means that everyone receives the same income or benefit as a per capita value, a Suits index of zero means that each person pays the same tax as a percentage of income. Additionally, a poll tax has a Suits index equal to the negative of the Gini coefficient for the same group.

== Examples ==
Suits index by tax in Minnesota, 2004
Tax	Suits index
Estate tax	0.270
Individual income tax	0.219
State taxes only	0.026
Total state and local taxes	−0.024
Alcoholic beverage excise tax	−0.083
Residential property taxes including impact of property tax refunds	−0.103
Mortgage and deed taxes	−0.130
Statewide property tax	−0.131
Motor vehicle sales tax	−0.142
Corporate franchise tax	−0.145
Motor vehicle registration tax	−0.147
General sales and use taxes	−0.175
General property taxes	−0.178
Local taxes only	−0.178
Residential property taxes without impact of property tax refunds	−0.180
Motor fuels excise tax (gas tax)	−0.253
MinnesotaCare taxes	−0.271
Gambling taxes	−0.477
Cigarette and tobacco excise taxes	−0.486

Suits index by tax in Texas, 2007
Tax	Suits index
Natural gas tax	0.001
School property tax	−0.06
Franchise tax	−0.11
Motor vehicle sales tax	−0.14
Sales tax	−0.18
Gasoline tax	−0.25

== See also ==
- Kakwani index
