= Accumulation by dispossession =

Policies to centralize wealth and power

Accumulation by dispossession is a concept presented by the Marxist geographer David Harvey. It defines neoliberal capitalist policies that result in a centralization of wealth and power in the hands of a few by dispossessing the public and private entities of their wealth or land. Such policies are visible in many western nations from the 1970s and to the present day. Harvey argues these policies are guided mainly by four practices: privatization, financialization, management and manipulation of crises, and state redistributions.

== Practices ==
=== Privatization ===
The 2022 World Inequality Report, a four-year research project organized by the economists Lucas Chancel, Thomas Piketty, Emmanuel Saez, and Gabriel Zucman, shows that "the world is marked by a very high level of income inequality and an extreme level of wealth inequality" and that these inequalities "seem to be about as great today as they were at the peak of western imperialism in the early 20th century." According to the report, the bottom half of the population owns 2% of global wealth, while the top 10% owns 76% of it. The top 1% owns 38%.

=== Mass incarceration ===
Several scholars have linked mass incarceration of the poor in the United States with the rise of neoliberalism. Sociologist Loïc Wacquant and Marxist economic geographer David Harvey have argued that the criminalization of poverty and mass incarceration is a neoliberal policy for dealing with social instability among economically marginalized populations. According to Wacquant, this situation follows the implementation of other neoliberal policies, which have allowed for the retrenchment of the social welfare state and the rise of punitive workfare, whilst increasing gentrification of urban areas, privatization of public functions, the shrinking of collective protections for the working class via economic deregulation and the rise of underpaid, precarious wage labor. By contrast, it is extremely lenient in dealing with those in the upper echelons of society, in particular when it comes to economic crimes of the upper class and corporations such as fraud, embezzlement, insider trading, credit and insurance fraud, money laundering and violation of commerce and labor codes. According to Wacquant, neoliberalism does not shrink government, but instead sets up a "centaur state" with little governmental oversight for those at the top and strict control of those at the bottom.

=== Financialization ===
The wave of financialization that set in the 1980s is facilitated by governmental deregulation which has made the financial system one of the main centers of redistributive activity. Stock promotions, Ponzi schemes, structured asset destruction through inflation, asset stripping through mergers and acquisitions, dispossession of assets (raiding of pension funds and their decimation by stock and corporate collapses) by credit and stock manipulations, are, according to Harvey, central features of the post-1970s capitalist financial system.

Those boards of directors are also on boards of corporations and any number of other legal vehicles who are also profiting from asset price swings. At the heart of accumulation by dispossession is the private control of the quantity of money supply that can be manipulated for private gain, which includes creating unemployment or restive conditions in the population. This process is well documented in English history as far back as prior to the founding of the Bank of England and before that in the Netherlands. The process works well with or without a central bank and with or without gold backing. The details are also manipulated from time to time as needed to satisfy popular rage or apathy.

== Examples ==
Margaret Thatcher's program for the privatization of social housing in Britain was initially seen as beneficial for the lower classes which could now move from rental to ownership at a relatively low cost, gain control over assets and increase their wealth. However, housing speculation took over following the transfers (particularly in the prime central locations), and low-income populations were forced out to the periphery. Ultimately, the new homeowners were also borrowers and paid portions of their yearly income as interest on long-term mortgages, effectively transferring a portion of their wealth to the owners of banks with licenses to create debt money from fractional reserves. Thatcher's council privatization scheme increased the potential number of borrowers in the UK by up to 20% of UK residents who lived in council housing at the end of the 1970s.

== See also ==
- Asset poverty – Economic and social condition
- Bagholder – Slang for shareholder left holding worthless stocks
- Capital accumulation – Dynamic that motivates pursuit of profit, central tenet of capitalism
- Causes of poverty
- Common land – Land owned collectively
- Dispossession, oppression, and depression – State of low mood and aversion to activity
- Economic abuse – Form of abuse
- Economic inequality – Distribution of income or wealth between different groups
- Essential facilities doctrine – Type of claim of monopolization made under competition laws
- Institutional abuse – Mistreatment of a person from a system of power
- Kitchen sink realism – British social realist artistic movement
- Mutualism (economic theory) – Anarchist school of thought and socialist economic theory
- Mutualism (movement) – Social movement
- Precarious work – Type of non-standard or temporary employment
- Property is theft! – French philosopher and economist (1809–1865)
- Socialist accumulation – Counterpart to the process of the primitive accumulation of capital
- Tacit collusion – Collusion between competitors
- The internal contradictions of capital accumulation
- Redistribution of income and wealth – Political philosophy
- Wage slavery – Dependence on wages to live
