= Empire of Democracy =

2019 book by Simon Reid-Henry

- First edition
- Author: Simon Reid-Henry
- Language: English
- Subject: History
- Publisher: John Murray
- Publication date: 2019
- Publication place: United Kingdom
- Media type: Print (hardback and paperback)
- Pages: 870
- ISBN: 978-1-451-68497-1
- Dewey Decimal: 321.8

Empire of Democracy (strapline: The Remaking of the West Since the Cold War, 1971-2019) is a 2019 book by British geographer and scholar Simon Reid-Henry about the transformation of Western democracy arising from neoliberalism and its impacts on political processes.

Reid-Henry said he was inspired to write the book following the 2011 far right wing attacks in Norway (which took place on the last day of his honeymoon), and a desire to identify the underlying trends that had disrupted the liberal and democratic order of the Western world, rather than write about the perpetrator per se. Although Reid-Henry had intended to focus on the geopolitics of the post-1989 world, the book ended up looking at political economy and social trends more broadly, and from an earlier starting point. The title of the book comes from Alexis de Tocquevilles' book Democracy in America which described the trans-national, transforming and expanding nature of American democracy that de Tocqueville witnessed.

The book starts with the period of economic dislocation and social unrest arising out of the 1960s that led to the Nixon shock. Over time a resetting of the post-War political economic order across the Western World as monetarism and market deregulation replace the Keynesian consensus. This order reaches its peak in the Post–Cold War era but flounders after 9/11, the Iraq War, the War in Afghanistan, and especially during the Great Recession. Governments are unable to marshal the necessary political will and creativity to resolve inherent contradictions, and with liberalism having lost its legitimacy and public trust corroded, authoritarian leaders emerge.

== Contents ==
Empire of Democracy is split into three parts. Part I (Democracy Unbound) starts with the breakdown of the Bretton Woods system and progresses through the 1970s and 1980s up to the Revolutions of 1989. The confidence of the post-Cold War period, marked by the 1990s United States boom is covered in Part II (Novus ordo seclorum. Part III (Victory without Peace) serves as the dénouement, rudely starting with the September 11 attacks and concluding with the 2017 inauguration of President Trump.

=== Prologue ===
A prologue (Two Helicopters) covers Charles de Gaulle's mysterious departure from Paris during the May 68 events, and President Nixon's departure on Marine One following his resignation – events which demonstrated there was significant momentum in the West for the existing political order to be upended

=== Part I: Democracy Unbound ===
- The Unravelling: The achievements of the post-war world was based on the nation state, planning and consumerism, which came at the cost of alienation, stress and anxiety. Discontent had emerged in the late 1960s, and the Vietnam War created division that lingered into the 1970s.
- The Crisis of Capitalism: Rising US government expenditure on the Vietnam War and social spending, and a balance of payments crisis, leads to the abandonment of the Bretton Woods system. Western economies are hit by stagflation, the 1973 Oil Crisis, and declining productivity and competitiveness. Unemployment, industrial discord and immigration create upheaval. However green shoots of a new pragmatic consensus slowly emerge, and swift monetary action targeting inflation brings confidence back to the global economy which is increasingly interdependent.
- The Reckoning: Extreme left wing movements grow in the 1970s. Governments struggle to manage voter expectations who increasingly identify as middle class. Slowly centre left governments, unable to adapt to new realities, are replaced or adapt to neo-liberalism. Instead of confronting these economic trends, the left moves to champion feminism, pacifism, environmentalism and identity politics. The right become ascendant in social as well as economic spheres. People become increasingly anti-authoritarian and libertarian, while business plays a greater role in policy-making.
- A Split in the World: Domestic and foreign policy are increasingly directed by human rights which are modelled on new concepts of individualism that serve as a cipher for political minimalism. Geopolitics is transformed to adapt to changes in the liberal consensus. Western Europe opens up to the Eastern Bloc. The European Community establishes a technocratic leadership and adopts the characteristics of a sovereign nation state. The political middle is increasingly hollowed out, and the space occupied by pressure groups and non-government organisations.
- Let Furies Have Their Hour: Ronald Reagan and Margaret Thatcher revolutionise their own countries as they redefine a new social contract. Neoliberalism takes hold in other parts of the world. Working class ideals decline in influence and urban landscapes are transformed. However these ideas hold no solutions to emerging challenges such rising inequality and the AIDS epidemic. Ideology propels the US towards a more confrontationist posture with the Soviet Union, which under Mikhail Gorbachev also begins to make reforms.
- The Victory: Remaking Europe: Economic stagnation in Eastern Europe, and Gorbachev's repudiation of the Brezhnev Doctrine leads to the sudden collapse of the Soviet bloc. Countries and ideologies compete to redefine what post Cold War Europe would look like, including on the questions of German reunification and east–west relations. The European Community's integrationist agenda gains momentum. The US becomes the sole superpower, with neoliberalism the now default global ideology.

=== Part II: Novus Ordo Seclorum ===
- America and a World Transformed: The US struggles to understand the post-Cold War landscape. President George Bush Snr intervenes in Panama and Kuwait. Easy victories make the US administration more confident in projecting military power, but increasingly hitches the US to the fate of the Middle East and other global entanglements. East Asia grows economic heft. Gorbachev's ousting in an unsuccessful coup seals the fate of the Soviet Union. Despite the US's global strength, its domestic sphere is plagued by recession, budget deficits, inequality and racial turmoil. Bill Clinton emerges as a leader best suited to America's new peace.
- The Great Convergence: A liberal institutional order emerges in the post-Cold War era. Former Soviet bloc countries struggle to adapt to free market reforms now demanded by these institutions, and corruption becomes endemic. The European Community becomes the even more integrated European Union, and its members fall in line adopting principles of monetary discipline. The Schengen Area and the European Court of Justice are established. Clinton moves the US towards deregulation and fiscally conservative policies, as do the governments of Australia, Canada, South Africa and New Zealand.
- A Democratic Peace?: Civil wars emerge across the post-Cold War world. The West increasingly intervenes in the name of liberal values, and the United Nations becomes more involved in peacekeeping. Global institutions rich in transnational relationships become more important. Europe struggles to comprehend and respond to the Bosnian civil war, and the US stumbles in Somalia, Haiti and Iraq.
- The New Prosperity: The 1990s is marked by a global economic boom and a spirit of optimism. Employment falls, wages rise, share markets rallies and the Internet is seen to herald a new information revolution. In the US, Clinton's 1993 Deficit Reduction Act rolls back Reagan-era tax cuts and reduces government spending, while the Financial Services Modernization Act deregulates the financial sector. With the British electorate experiencing social mobility and prosperity, the UK Labour Party under Tony Blair evolves to make it more electorally acceptable to a consumerist middle class, a trend repeated by other centre-left parties that embrace social responsibility, community values, equality of opportunity and accountability. This has the unanticipated effect of making social democracy dependent on a buoyant economy, and leaves the left weakened.
- Farewell to All That: Western Governments become more technocratic and personality driven, and the policies of major parties begin to converge. Citizens seen more as stakeholders rather than electors, and voter turnout and union membership drop. Populist leaders are able to capitalise on public disengagement, including Steve Forbes, Silvio Berlusconi, Jörg Haider and Pauline Hanson. Newt Gingrich’s 1994 Contract with America makes US politics more partisan and clientelist. Political action committees become the most important sources of party funding and lobbyists rise in influence. In a landmark 1984 US Supreme Court case (Chevron U.S.A., Inc. v. Natural Resources Defense Council, Inc.), US federal agencies ability to interpret statutes, and this starts a trend of industries self-regulating. The market encroaches into public space, leading to the gentrification of urban areas. Social welfare is rolled back, and the public now assume greater risk and debt (through credit cards). Films like La Haine, Blair Witch Project, Trainspotting, and American Beauty show how people adapt rather than seek to challenge change.
- Blueprints for the New Millennium: The left and right produce competing visions for a new world order: the neo-conservative Project for the New American Century seeks to project US values abroad (often with democracy conflated with neoliberalism), while the left rallies against globalism in the Battle of Seattle. The concept of statehood is questioned; even secessionist movements in Scotland and Catalonia based their case on economics rather than nationalism. The US public becomes resigned to politics being unaccountable (especially after the Clinton–Lewinsky scandal); they are instead more focussed on their self-interest. Decision-making is increasingly depoliticised, preventing the hollowed out state from intervening to address emerging inequality. As the Millenium approached the West looked strong, and liberalism would plot the future.

=== Part III: Victory Without Peace ===
- The Assault on Freedom: The 9/11 attacks intensify contradictions in modern liberal democracies, giving succour to radical neo-conservatism and "The Vulcans" who see freedom not just as a political value as much as a motor of history. The security state, demonstrated by the PATRIOT Act and Guantanamo Bay, gains new powers and the trend for smaller government is reversed. The US is motivated to demonstrate its superpower status and invades Iraq, but finds occupation difficult. Global agreements were airbrushed away. Islamist terrorist attacks take place in Spain, Indonesia and elsewhere, and the resulting heightened security awareness in the West leads to borders and social fissures. Multiculturalism is challenged in Europe, which is unable to integrate a growing minority population into economic life. Western belligerence peaks until around 2006 when greater oversight is achieved, not through a public outcry but through legal processes.
- In the Shadow of War: Military operations raise the US national debt and divert spending from social programs. A spike in the price of oil compels the US Federal Reserve to lower interest rates while financial markets continue to deregulate. Class interests like property rights are increasingly entrenched in law. Consultants take the place of public servants in many countries, and even military contractors are used in conflicts to avoid legal oversight. The Euro and harmonised policies bring confidence and innovation to Europe, but the European public continues to distrust the European Union and vote against a proposed Constitution. Scandals including Enron, WorldCom and Parmalat further erode public trust in government. Hurricane Katrina reveals significant racial inequality and disadvantage. China's entry into the WTO accelerates outsourcing. Conservative parties exploit working class grievances ironically caused by their own neo-liberal policies. Barack Obama wins office through public dissatisfaction with establishment politicians.
- The Great Recession: Loose regulation and monetary policy in the US create bubbles in the housing and bond markets, ultimately leading to the collapse of major American investment banks and a global recession. American taxpayers are forced to fund bailouts, while in Europe recovery is hampered by poor coordination, limited policy levers, and the Stability and Growth Pact. Greece spirals into insolvency and is forced into a brutal, punitive settlement with the Troika. Ireland, Iceland, Spain and Portugal follow. The G20 heralds that global economic power has shifted, and provides some stability as the US and China become co-dependent. Precarity, inequality and austerity sow the seeds of an eventual anti-elite backlash.
- Back to the Streets: The Great Recession causes political momentum to move away from technocrats and towards the fringes. Protests intensify in the Arab World, US, England, Spain and elsewhere, but leftist movements largely fail as they became exclusionary and do not appeal to a public that now abhors disorder. Instead the far right makes political inroads among an insecure angry public, further inflamed by the 2015 European migrant crisis. Mistrust grows against the EU, and between creditor and debtor European countries. In the US President Obama confronts resurgent Republicans who seek to capitalise on public anger against bailouts, and the political culture becomes more fractured. WikiLeaks makes an indelible impression of government malfeasance and dishonesty. Inequality raise barriers between and within countries.
- Crisis after Crisis: Europe's periphery becomes unstable. In response to protests Russia slides into autocracy, as does Turkey. Eastern European countries turn to illiberal politicians. The killing of Osama bin Laden has the unintended affect of creating Islamic State as the US prematurely withdraws troops. Syria erupts into a civil war, and over a million refugees flee to Europe. European countries are unable to agree to a coordinated response. The UK votes to leave the EU, partially because more voters had a stronger British political identity than a European one. Shortly after, Donald Trump is elected US president on the back of a backlash against liberal internationalism and the poor campaign of his opponent. Across the West, declining civic trust undermines the concept of truth on which the foundations of Western democracy and the moral legitimacy of its institutions are based on.

=== Epilogue: The End of an Era? ===
The key existential themes of the changes in Western society are explored. The book concludes that it remains possible for collective action to rescue democracy, through understanding why capitalist prosperity failed to curb the rise of illiberalism, and having the patience to make the necessary structural changes.

== Reviews ==
Reviews of Empire of Democracy were generally positive. Writing for The Washington Post, Mario Del Pero wrote that Reid-Henry narrated the wide span of recent history with "elegance and gusto", identifying the contradictions that emerged in a "consumerist democracy", but criticised the absence of coverage of economic developments outside the West, a lack of nuance in differentiating different economic policies, and a number of factual mistakes.

The Nation's Richard J. Evans appreciated that book's account of the 2008 financial crisis and the depth applied in assessing the strengths and weaknesses of neo-liberalism, but noted the book was plagued by generalisations and limited discussion about the impacts of specific individuals.

Dominic Sandbrook's review in The Times criticised the lack of originality and specificity in Reid-Henry's arguments made with sweeping, overconfident generalisations, as well as not including enough perspectives of individuals.

== See also ==
- A Brief History of Equality
- Capital and Ideology
- Criticism of capitalism
- Gilded Age
- The Hidden Wealth of Nations
- Progress and Poverty
- Capital in the Twenty-First Century
- Democratic peace theory
- Post-truth politics
- Sociocultural evolution
