= Capital in the Twenty-First Century =

2013 book by economist Thomas Piketty

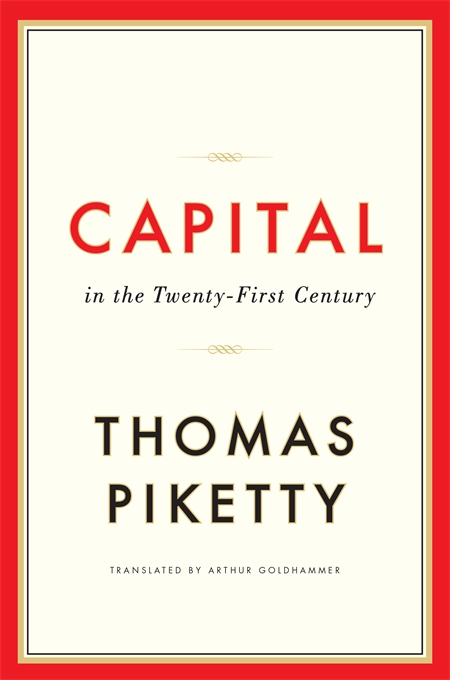
- Hardcover edition
- Author: Thomas Piketty
- Original title: Le Capital au XXI^{e} siècle
- Translator: Arthur Goldhammer
- Language: French
- Subjects: Political economy, economic history, economic inequality, macroeconomics
- Publisher: Éditions du Seuil; Harvard University Press
- Publication date: August 2013
- English publication date: April 15, 2014
- Media type: Print (hardback)
- Pages: 696
- ISBN: 978-0-674-43000-6

Capital in the Twenty-First Century (French: Le Capital au XXI^{e} siècle) is a book written by French economist Thomas Piketty. It focuses on wealth and income inequality in Europe and the United States since the 18th century. It was first published in French (as Le Capital au XXI^{e} siècle) in August 2013; an English translation by Arthur Goldhammer followed in April 2014.

The book's central thesis is that when the rate of return on capital (r) is greater than the rate of economic growth (g) over the long term, the result is concentration of wealth, and this unequal distribution of wealth causes social and economic instability. Piketty proposes a global system of progressive wealth taxes to help reduce inequality and avoid the vast majority of wealth coming under the control of a tiny minority.

At the end of 2014, Piketty released a paper where he stated that he does not consider the relationship between the rate of return on capital and the rate of economic growth as the only or primary tool for considering changes in income and wealth inequality. He also noted that r > g is not a useful tool for the discussion of rising inequality of labor income.

On May 18, 2014, the English edition reached number one on The New York Times Best Seller list for best selling hardcover nonfiction and became the greatest sales success ever of academic publisher Harvard University Press. As of January 2015, the book had sold 1.5 million copies in French, English, German, Chinese, and Spanish. The book is a worldwide success, with over 2.5 million copies sold by the end of 2017.

The book was adapted into a feature documentary film, directed by New Zealand filmmaker Justin Pemberton, and released in 2020.

== Publication and initial reception ==
When first published in French in August 2013, Laurent Mauduit characterized it as "a political and theoretical bulldozer". As news spread of its thesis in the English-speaking world, Paul Krugman hailed it as a landmark, while former senior World Bank economist Branko Milanović considers it "one of the watershed books in economic thinking". In response to widespread curiosity abroad aroused by reviews of the original French edition published by Seuil in September 2013, it was translated rapidly into English and its publication date was pushed forward to March 2014 by Belknap. It proved an overnight sensation and ousted Michael Lewis's financial exposé, Flash Boys: Cracking the Money Code, from the top of the US best-seller list. Within a year of its publication, Stephanie Kelton spoke of a "Piketty phenomenon", and in Germany three books had been published specifically dealing with Piketty's critique.

== Contents ==
The central thesis of the book is that inequality is not an accident, but rather a feature of capitalism and can only be reversed through state interventionism. The book thus argues that, unless capitalism is reformed, the very democratic order will be threatened.

Piketty bases his argument on a formula that relates the rate of return on capital (r) to economic growth (g), where r includes profits, dividends, interest, rents, and other income from capital and g is measured as growth of society's income or output. He argues that when the rate of growth is low, then wealth tends to accumulate more quickly from r than from labor and tends to accumulate more among the top 10% and 1%, increasing inequality. Thus, the fundamental force for divergence and greater wealth inequality can be summed up in the inequality r > g. He analyzes inheritance from the perspective of the same formula.

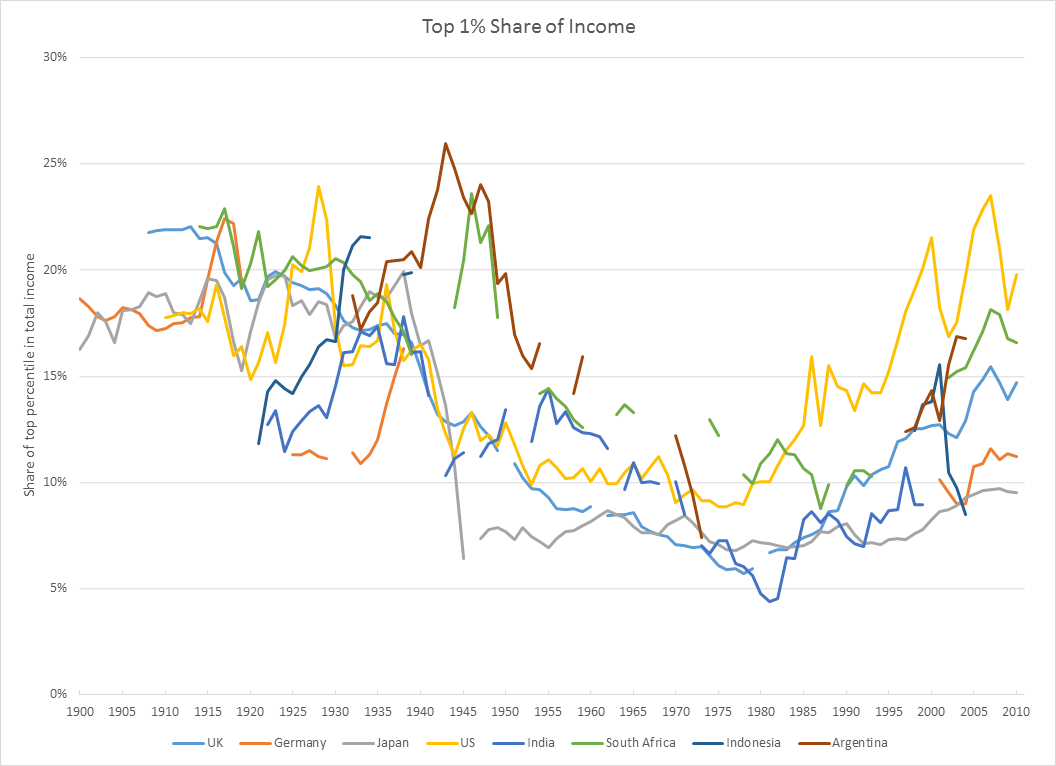
Income inequality as measured by the income of the top 1% in several countries. Inequality tended to drop in the middle of the century but has increased in the past several decades.

The book argues that there was a trend towards higher inequality that was reversed between 1930 and 1975 due to unique circumstances: the two world wars, the Great Depression, and a debt-fueled recession destroyed much wealth, particularly that owned by the elite. These events prompted governments to undertake steps towards redistributing income, especially in the post–World War II period. The fast, worldwide economic growth of that time began to reduce the importance of inherited wealth in the global economy.

The book argues that the world today is returning towards "patrimonial capitalism", in which much of the economy is dominated by inherited wealth: the power of this economic class is increasing, threatening to create an oligarchy. Piketty cites novels by Honoré de Balzac, Jane Austen, and Henry James to describe the rigid class structure based on accumulated capital that existed in England and France in the early 1800s.

Piketty proposes that a progressive annual global wealth tax of up to 2%, combined with a progressive income tax reaching as high as 80%, would reduce inequality, although he says that such a tax "would be politically impossible".

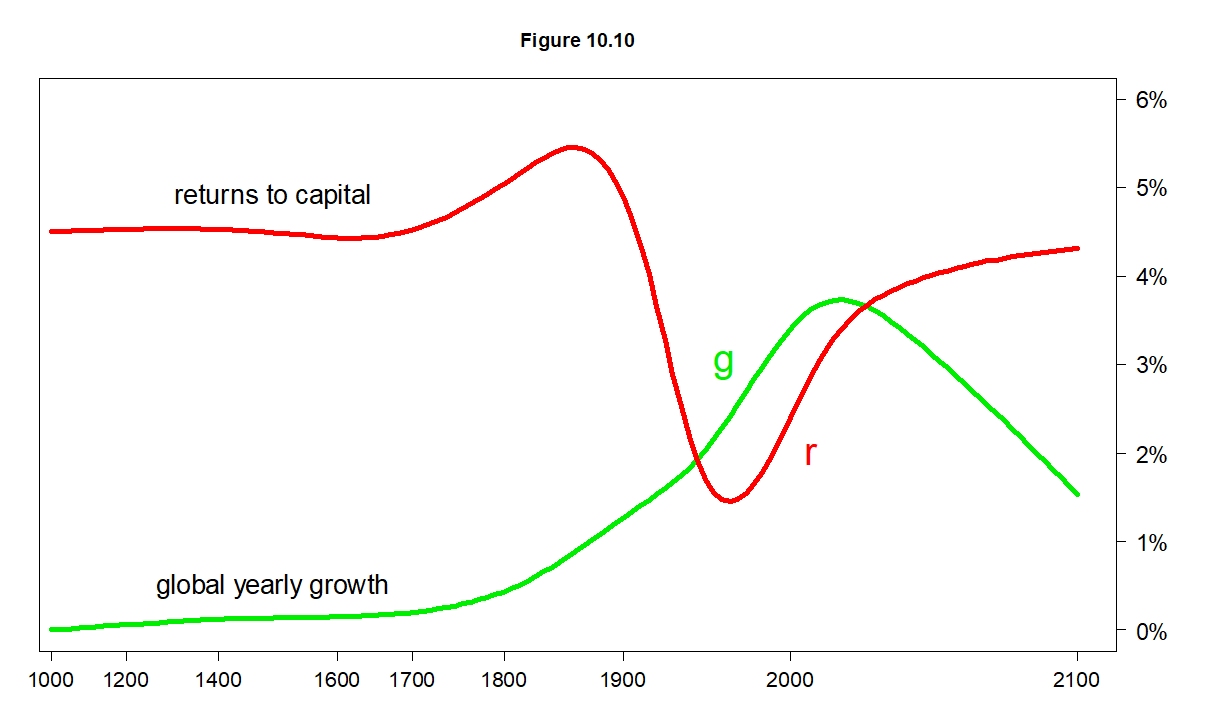
Piketty believes the growth rate will once again fall below the rate of return, and the twentieth century will be an aberration in terms of inequality.

Without tax adjustment, Piketty predicts a world of low economic growth and extreme inequality. His data show that over long periods of time, the average return on investment outpaces productivity-based income by a wide margin. He dismisses the idea that bursts of productivity resulting from technological advances can be relied on to return sustained economic growth; we should not expect "a more just and rational order" to arise based on "caprices of technology", and return on investment can increase when technology can be substituted for people.

== Reception ==
The book's exceptional success was widely attributed to "being about the right subject at the right time", as The Economist put it. Piketty himself recognized there is a common sense that "inequality and wealth in the United States have been widening." The Occupy movement's "We are the 99%" slogan made talk of inequality "the zeitgeist of our age – an age of seemingly permanent crisis and austerity," as Adam Booth put it.

British author Paul Mason dismissed charges of "soft Marxism" as "completely misplaced", noting that Marx described social relations trying to unveil capitalism's inner tendencies, where Piketty solely relies on social categories and historical data. Piketty rather "placed an unexploded bomb within mainstream, classical economics," he concludes.

Other scholars have built upon Piketty's work, such as historian Walter Scheidel, who concurs with Piketty in his own study of inequality (The Great Leveler, 2017) that the gap will continue to widen as the decades pass but contends that Piketty's solutions are untenable.

=== Praise ===
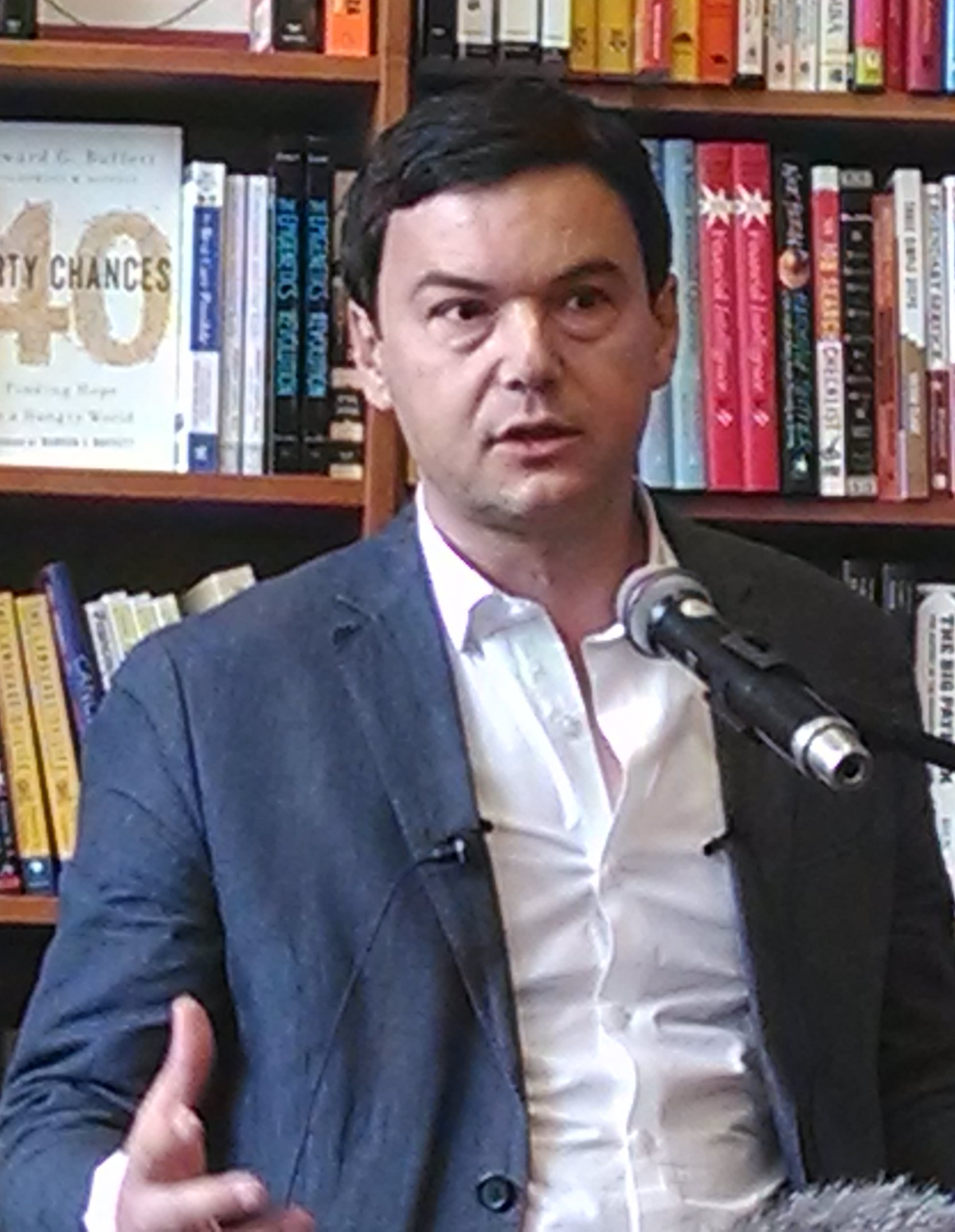
The author Thomas Piketty

Paul Krugman called the book a "magnificent, sweeping meditation on inequality" and "the most important economics book of the year – and maybe of the decade." He distinguishes the book from other bestsellers on economics as it constitutes "serious, discourse-changing scholarship". Krugman also wrote:

At a time when the concentration of wealth and income in the hands of a few has resurfaced as a central political issue, Piketty doesn't just offer invaluable documentation of what is happening, with unmatched historical depth. He also offers what amounts to a unified field theory of inequality, one that integrates economic growth, the distribution of income between capital and labor, and the distribution of wealth and income among individuals into a single frame. ... Capital in the Twenty-First Century is an extremely important book on all fronts. Piketty has transformed our economic discourse; we'll never talk about wealth and inequality the same way we used to.

Steven Pearlstein called it a "triumph of economic history over the theoretical, mathematical modeling that has come to dominate the economics profession in recent years", but also added: "Piketty's analysis of the past is more impressive than his predictions for the future are convincing."

Branko Milanović, a former senior economist at the World Bank, called the book "one of the watershed books in economic thinking."

British historian Andrew Hussey called the book "epic" and "groundbreaking" and argues that it proves "scientifically" that the Occupy movement was correct in its assertion that "capitalism isn't working".

According to Robert Solow, Piketty has made a "new and powerful contribution to an old topic: as long as the rate of return exceeds the rate of growth, the income and wealth of the rich will grow faster than the typical income from work".

French historian and political scientist Emmanuel Todd called Capital in the Twenty-First Century a "masterpiece" and "a seminal book on the economic and social evolution of the planet".

The book has been described as "a political and theoretical bulldozer" in the French press.

The Economist wrote: "A modern surge in inequality has new economists wondering, as Marx and Ricardo did, which forces may be stopping the fruits of capitalism from being more widely distributed. Capital in the Twenty-First Century ... is an authoritative guide to the question."

Will Hutton wrote: "Like Friedman, Piketty is a man for the times. For 1970s anxieties about inflation substitute today's concerns about the emergence of the plutocratic rich and their impact on economy and society. ... the current level of rising wealth inequality, set to grow still further, now imperils the very future of capitalism. He has proved it."

Clive Crook, while being strongly critical of the book, described it as earning more praise than any other economics book in decades. He suggests it was "greeted with... erotic intensity" because of a demand for "scholarly respectability" that would affirm the belief that inequality is, quoting John Cassidy, "the defining issue of our era".

In the introduction to the essay collection After Piketty (2017), Piketty is praised for arguing, before Donald Trump's election, that those with property will dominate the twenty-first century political economy and set in motion forces to keep the rate of profit high enough to create plutocracy.

=== Criticism ===
==== Critique of the normative content ====
One strand of critique faults Piketty for placing inequality at the center of analysis without any reflection on why it matters.

According to Financial Times columnist Martin Wolf, he merely assumes that inequality matters, but never explains why. He only demonstrates that it exists and how it worsens. Or as his colleague Clive Crook put it: "Aside from its other flaws, Capital in the 21st Century invites readers to believe not just that inequality is important, but that nothing else matters. This book wants you to worry about low growth in the coming decades not because that would mean a slower rise in living standards, but because it might ... worsen inequality."

Icelandic professor Hannes H. Gissurarson asserts that Piketty is replacing American philosopher John Rawls as the essential thinker of the left. In addition to questioning common measures of wealth distribution, he also criticizes Piketty for being, unlike Rawls, "much more concerned with the rich than with the poor". Hannes admits that the "rapid rise in the income of the super-rich of the world" is happening but doesn't view this trend as being a problem so long as the poor do not get poorer.

==== Methodological critique ====
Lawrence Summers criticizes Piketty for underestimating the diminishing returns on capital, which he believes will offset the return on capital and hence set an upper limit to inequality. Summers challenges another of Piketty's assumptions: that returns to wealth are largely reinvested. A declining ratio of saving to wealth would also set upper limits on inequality in society. Of 400 wealthiest Americans in 1982, only one in ten remained on the list in 2012, and an increasing share of wealthiest people have not increased their fortunes. Moreover, top 1% incomes are now mostly salaries, not capital incomes. Most other economists explain the rise of top 1% incomes by globalization and technological change.

James K. Galbraith criticizes Piketty for using "an empirical measure that is unrelated to productive physical capital and whose dollar value depends, in part, on the return on capital. Where does the rate of return come from? Piketty never says". Galbraith also says: "Despite its great ambitions, his book is not the accomplished work of high theory that its title, length and reception (so far) suggest."

Daron Acemoglu and James A. Robinson used the economic histories of Sweden and South Africa to show that social inequality depends much more on institutional factors than Piketty's factors like the difference between rate of return and growth. Cross-country analysis also shows that the top 1%'s share of income does not depend on that difference. The professors write that general laws, which is how they characterize Piketty's postulations, "are unhelpful as a guide to understand the past or predict the future because they ignore the central role of political and economic institutions in shaping the evolution of technology and the distribution of resources in a society". Per Krusell and Anthony Smith criticise Piketty's second law as implausible based on empirically supported theories of savings and that the data supports theories opposed to Piketty's.

Paul Romer criticises that while the data and empirical analysis is presented with admirable clarity and precision, the theory is presented in less detail. In his opinion the work was written with the attitude "Empirical work is science; theory is entertainment" and therefore an example for mathiness.

Lawrence Blume and Steven Durlauf criticized the book in the Journal of Political Economy for being "unpersuasive when it turns from description to analysis... Both of us are very liberal (in the contemporary as opposed to classical sense), and we regard ourselves as egalitarians. We are therefore disturbed that Piketty has undermined the egalitarian case with weak empirical, analytical, and ethical arguments."

==== Critique of Piketty's basic concepts ====
German economist Stefan Homburg criticizes Piketty for equating wealth with capital. Homburg argues that wealth does not only embrace capital goods in the sense of produced means of production, but also land and other natural resources. Homburg argues that observed increases in wealth income ratios reflect rising land prices and not an accumulation of machinery. Joseph E. Stiglitz endorses this view, pointing out that "a large fraction of the increase in wealth is an increase in the value of land, not in the amount of capital goods".

This idea is furthered by Matthew Rognlie, then a graduate student at MIT, who published a paper in March 2015 with the Brookings Institution that argues that Piketty did not take the effects of depreciation into account enough in his analysis of the growing importance of capital. Rognlie also found that "surging house prices are almost entirely responsible for growing returns on capital." A similar critique was made by Odran Bonnet, et al. in "Does housing capital contribute to inequality? A comment on Thomas Piketty's Capital in the 21st Century published in 2014."

Marxist academic David Harvey, while praising the book for demolishing "the widely-held view that free market capitalism spreads the wealth around and that it is the great bulwark for the defense of individual liberties and freedoms," is largely critical of Piketty for, among other things, his "mistaken definition of capital", which Harvey describes as:

... a process, not a thing ... a process of circulation in which money is used to make more money often, but not exclusively through the exploitation of labor power. Piketty defines capital as the stock of all assets held by private individuals, corporations and governments that can be traded in the market no matter whether these assets are being used or not.

Harvey further argues that Piketty's "proposals as to the remedies for the inequalities are naïve if not utopian. And he has certainly not produced a working model for capital of the twenty-first century. For that, we still need Marx or his modern-day equivalent". Harvey also takes Piketty to task for dismissing Marx's Das Kapital without ever having read it.

IMF economist Carlos Góes researched the basic thesis put forth by the book – that when the rate of return on capital (r) is greater than the rate of economic growth (g) over the long term, the result is concentration of wealth – and found no empirical support for it; in fact, an opposite trend was identified in 75% of the countries studied in depth. Piketty's response noted, however, that Góes used measures of income inequality rather than wealth inequality, and inappropriately took the interest rate on sovereign debt as his index of the rate of return on capital, which makes his results not commensurate with those of Piketty's study.

==== Critique of the proposed measures ====
In a similar vein, philosopher Nicholas Vrousalis faults Piketty's remedies for misconstruing the kind of political "counter-agency" required to remove the inequalities Piketty criticizes and for thinking that they are compatible with capitalism.

==== Critique of the conventional paradigm ====
Norwegian economist and journalist Maria Reinertsen compares the book to the 2014 book Counting on Marilyn Waring: New Advances in Feminist Economics, by Ailsa McKay and Margunn Bjørnholt, arguing that, "while Capital in the Twenty-First Century barely touches the boundaries of the discipline in its focus on the rich, Counting on Marilyn Waring challenges most limits of what economists should care about".

=== Allegation of data errors ===
On May 23, 2014, Chris Giles, economics editor of the Financial Times (FT), identified what he claims are "unexplained errors" in Piketty's data, in particular regarding wealth inequality increases since the 1970s. The FT wrote in part:

The data ... contain a series of errors that skew his findings. The FT found mistakes and unexplained entries in his spreadsheets, similar to those which last year undermined the work on public debt and growth of Carmen Reinhart and Kenneth Rogoff.

The central theme of Prof Piketty's work is that wealth inequalities are heading back up to levels last seen before World War I. The investigation undercuts this claim, indicating there is little evidence in Prof Piketty's original sources to bear out the thesis that an increasing share of total wealth is held by the richest few.

Piketty wrote a response defending his findings and arguing that subsequent studies (he links to Emmanuel Saez and Gabriel Zucman's March 2014 presentation, The Distribution of US Wealth, Capital Income and Returns since 1913) confirm his conclusions about increasing wealth inequality and actually show a greater increase in inequality for the United States than he does in his book. In an interview with Agence France-Presse, he accused the Financial Times of "dishonest criticism" and said that the paper "is being ridiculous because all of its contemporaries recognise that the biggest fortunes have grown faster".

The accusation received wide press coverage. Some sources said the Financial Times has overstated its case. For example, The Economist, a sister publication to the Financial Times at that time, wrote:

Mr Giles's analysis is impressive, and one certainly hopes that further work by Mr Giles, Mr Piketty or others will clarify whether mistakes have been made, how they came to be introduced and what their effects are. Based on the information Mr Giles has provided so far, however, the analysis does not seem to support many of the allegations made by the FT, or the conclusion that the book's argument is wrong.

Scott Winship, a sociologist at the Manhattan Institute for Policy Research and critic of Piketty, asserts the allegations are not "significant for the fundamental question of whether Piketty's thesis is right or not ... It's hard to think Piketty did something unethical when he put it up there for people like me to delve into his figures and find something that looks sketchy ... Piketty has been as good or better than anyone at both making all his data available and documenting what he does generally".

In addition to Winship, the economists Alan Reynolds, Justin Wolfers, James Hamilton and Gabriel Zucman claim that FT's assertions go too far. Paul Krugman noted that "anyone imagining that the whole notion of rising wealth inequality has been refuted is almost surely going to be disappointed". Emmanuel Saez, a colleague of Piketty and one of the economists cited by Giles to discredit him, stated that "Piketty's choice and judgement were quite good" and that his own research supports Piketty's thesis. Piketty released a full point-by-point rebuttal on his website.

A 2017 study in Social Science History by University of California Riverside economic historian Richard Sutch concluded "that Piketty's data for the wealth share of the top 10 percent for the period 1870 to 1970 are unreliable ... Piketty's data for the top 1 percent of the distribution for the nineteenth century (1810–1910) are also unreliable ... The values Piketty reported for the twentieth century (1910–2010) are based on more solid ground, but have the disadvantage of muting the marked rise of inequality during the Roaring Twenties and the decline associated with the Great Depression."

== Awards and honours ==
- 2014 Financial Times and McKinsey Business Book of the Year Award
- 2014 National Book Critics Circle Award (General Nonfiction) finalist
- 2014 British Academy Medal

== Editions ==
- Le Capital au XXI^{e} siècle, Éditions du Seuil, Paris, 2013, ISBN 978-2021082289 (in French)
- Capital in the Twenty-First Century, Harvard University Press, 2014, ISBN 978-0674430006

== See also ==
- A Brief History of Equality
- Capital and Ideology
- Capital in the Anthropocene – 2020 book by Kohei Saito
- Criticism of capitalism
- Elite overproduction
- Empire of Democracy
- Gilded Age
- The Hidden Wealth of Nations
- Labor share – Economics concept
- Progress and Poverty
