= World Inequality Database =

Database of wealth and income distribution

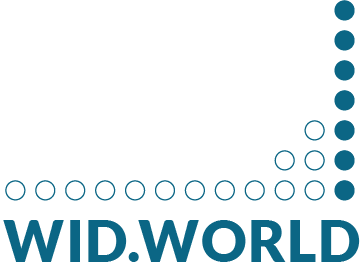
WID logo

World Inequality Database (WID), previously The World Wealth and Income Database, also known as WID.world, is an extensive, open and accessible database "on the historical evolution of the world distribution of income and wealth, both within countries and between countries".

== World Inequality Lab ==
The World Inequality Lab aims to promote research on global inequality dynamics. Its missions are the intension of the World Inequality Database, the production of analysis on global inequality dynamics, and the dissemination in the public debate.

The Lab works in close coordination with a large international network of researchers (over one hundred researchers covering nearly seventy countries) contributing to the database, in a collaborative effort to extend the existing database, which provides data on both distribution of income and wealth, "as well as the distribution of different forms of capital assets, in the analyzed countries".

The first WID, which was placed in an open source repository in September 2013, was compiled by Facundo Alvaredo, Anthony B. Atkinson, Thomas Piketty, Emmanuel Saez, and Gabriel Zucman. By 2015, the WID provided data series on the distribution of income and wealth in 33 countries mainly from the Americas and Europe. At that time, the intention was to "include data series for an additional forty countries."

From 2016 to 2017, through a 2015 Centers for Equitable Growth (CEG), Piketty, Saez, and Zucman studied Distributional National Accounts (DINA) for the United States. "DINA are defined as distributional statistics of pre-tax and post-tax income and wealth consistent with National Income and Product Accounts, and the Flow of Funds of the United States."

== World Inequality Report ==
World Inequality Report is a report by the World Inequality Lab at the Paris School of Economics that provides estimates of global income and wealth inequality based on the most recent findings compiled by the World Inequality Database (WID). WID, also referred to as WID.world, is an open source database, that is part of an international collaborative effort of over a hundred researchers in five continents. The World Inequality Report includes discussions on potential future academic research as well as content useful for public debates and policy related to economic inequality. The first report, entitled World Inequality Report 2018, which was released on December 14, 2017, at the Paris School of Economics during the first WID.world Conference, was compiled by Facundo Alvaredo, Lucas Chancel, Thomas Piketty, Emmanuel Saez, and Gabriel Zucman based on WID data. The 300-page report cautions that since 1980, around the globe, there has been an increase in the gap between rich and poor. In Europe, the increase in inequality increased more moderately while in North America and Asia, the increase was rapid. In the Middle East, Africa, and Brazil, income inequality did not increase but remained at very high levels.

=== World Inequality Report, 2022 ===
The 2022 World Inequality Report was published on Dec. 7th 2021. It was coordinated by economic and inequality experts Lucas Chancel, Thomas Piketty, Emmanuel Saez, and Gabriel Zucman over four years.

=== World Inequality Report, 2018 ===
In 2018 Facundo Alvaredo, Lucas Chancel, Thomas Piketty, Emmanuel Saez, and Gabriel Zucman compiled the first report, the "World Inequality Report 2018" which was released on December 14, 2017, at the Paris School of Economics during the first WID.world Conference.

The five part 300-page report discusses "the WID.world project and the measurement of economic inequality in Part I, trends in global income inequality in Part II, public versus private capital dynamics in Part III, trends in global wealth inequality in Part IV, "Tackling Economic Inequality" Methodological "details on how estimations were constructed are available at the report's website". According to the New York Times, "Policy, it turns out, matters. More aggressive redistribution through taxes and transfers has spared Europe from the acute disparities that Americans have grown used to. Unequal access to education is helping reproduce inequality in the United States down the generations." The Times article also noted that, "China's strategy based on low-skill manufacturing for export, and underpinned by aggressive investment in infrastructure, has proven more effective at raising living standards for the bottom half of the population than India's more inward-looking strategy, which has limited the benefits of globalization to the well-educated elite." Tetlow of the Financial Times described inequality as the "defining characteristic of the age" as The rich get richer and the poor get poorer. The India Times article drew attention to the way in which "[d]eregulation and opening-up reforms in India since 1980s have led to substantial increase in inequality so much that top 0.1% of earners has continued to capture more growth than all those in the bottom 50% combined." The WIR reported that, "Income inequality in India has reached historically high levels. In 2014, the share of national income accruing to India's top 1% of earners was 22%, while the share of the top 10% was around 56%."

Quartz cited the report, "[S]ince 1980 the top 0.1% have captured as much income growth as the entire bottom half of world's (adult) population. And for the group of people in between the bottom 50% and top 1%—mostly the lower- and middle-income groups in North America and Europe—income growth has been either sluggish or flat." The WIR 2018 shows that, "The gap between rich and poor has increased in nearly every region in the world over the past few decades." Since "1980, income inequality has increased rapidly in North America and Asia, increased more moderately in Europe, and stabilized at very high levels in the Middle East, Africa, and Brazil."

== History ==
Pioneers of income inequality studies include Simon Kuznets' 1953 study, and A. B. Atkinson and Alan Harrison's 1978 study. In 1953 Kuznet co-edited Shares of Upper Income Groups in Savings. Kuznet, an American economist, statistician, demographer, economic historian, and winner of the 1971 Nobel Memorial Prize in Economic Sciences, identified the historical series of economic movements such as "Kuznets swing", in the economy cycles.

== Media coverage ==
Within days of its December 14, 2017, publication online, the report was featured in articles in the New York Times, The Guardian, Quartz, Financial Times, the India Times, and Associated Press via ABC News.

In the interview with Quartz, Piketty warned of the impediments to getting "a comprehensive picture of wealth", such as tax havens. Piketty observed that "there are financial and political forces that have a vested interest in keeping this information secret," noting the "paradox of today's globalized economy" where "we are supposed to be in the era of big data and transparency, and we see that we still don't have access to all the data sources we would need."

== Thomas Piketty ==
In Capital is Back, University of California at Berkeley's French economist Gabriel Zucman and Thomas Piketty investigate the evolution of aggregate wealth-to-income ratios in the top eight developed economies, reaching back as far as 1700 in the case of the U.S., U.K., Germany, and France, and find that wealth-income ratios have risen from about "200-300% in 1970 to 400-600% in 2010", levels unknown since the 18th and 19th centuries. Most of the change can be explained by the long-run recovery of asset prices, the slowdown of productivity, and population growth. According to The New York Times Book Review, Zucman is mostly known for his research on tax havens, popularized in his book The Hidden Wealth of Nations.
