= EU Tax Observatory =

- EU Tax Observatory
- EUTO Logo
- Abbreviation: EUTO or Eutax
- Formation: June 2021; 5 years ago
- Type: Research institute
- Purpose: Basic research
- Headquarters: Paris, France
- Fields: Taxation
- Director: Gabriel Zucman
- Funding: European Union
- Staff: ~30 (2024)
- Website: www.taxobservatory.eu

The EU Tax Observatory (EUTO, Eutax) is a research institute dedicated to studying tax evasion and avoidance in the European Union, established in June 2021. Its offices are hosted at the Paris School of Economics, with staff also hosted at the University of Copenhagen. In its first year of operation its budget was €1.1 million, funded primarily by the EU's Directorate-General for Taxation and Customs Union.

The Observatory's October 2023 annual report on tax evasion described the potential impact of a wealth tax on billionaires and of a minimum tax on companies' profits. It also described ways for countries to unilaterally implement such policies and fight tax avoidance.
