= Internal contradictions of capital accumulation =

The internal contradictions of capital accumulation is an essential concept of crisis theory, which is associated with Marxist economic theory. While the same phenomenon is described in neoclassical economic theory, in that literature it is referred to as systemic risk.

== The process of economic crises ==
Economic geographer David Harvey argues that the multi-stage process of capital accumulation reveals a number of internal contradictions:

- Step 1 – The power of labor is broken down and wages fall. This is referred to as "wage repression" or "wage deflation" and is accomplished by outsourcing and offshoring production.
- Step 2 – Corporate profits—especially in the financial sector—increase, roughly in proportion to the degree to which wages fall in some sectors of the economy.
- Step 3 – In order to maintain the growth of profits catalyzed by wage deflation, it is necessary to sell or "supply" the market with more goods.
- Step 4 – However, increasing supply is increasingly problematic since "the demand" or the purchasers of goods often consist of the same population or labor pool whose wages have been repressed in step 1. In other words, by repressing wages the corporate forces working in congress with the financial sector have also repressed the buying power of the average consumer, which prevents them from maintaining the growth in profits that was catalyzed by the deflation of wages.
- Step 5 – Credit markets are pumped-up in order to supply the average consumer with more capital or buying power without increasing wages/decreasing profits. For example, mortgages and credit cards are made available to individuals or to organizations whose income does not indicate that they will be able to pay back the money they are borrowing. The proliferation of subprime mortgages throughout the American market preceding the Great Recession would be an example of this phenomenon.
- Step 6 – These simultaneous and interconnected trends—falling wages and rising debt—eventually manifest in a cascade of debt defaults.
- Step 7 – These cascading defaults eventually manifest in an institutional failure. The failure of one institution or bank has a cascading effect on other banks which are owed money by the first bank in trouble, causing a cascading failure—such as the cascading failure following the bankruptcy of Lehman Brothers, or Bear Stearns which led to the bailout of AIG and catalyzed the market failures which characterized the beginning of the Great Recession.
- Step 8 – Assuming the economy in which the crisis began to unfold does not totally collapse, the locus of the crisis regains some competitive edge as the crisis spreads.
- Step 9 – This geographic relocation cascades into its own process referred to as accumulation by dispossession. The crisis relocates itself geographically, beginning all over again while the site of its geographical origins begins taking steps towards recovery.

== See also ==
- Accumulation by dispossession
- Bank run
- Crisis theory
- David Harvey
- Financial crisis
- Glass–Steagall Act
- Macroprudential policy
- Modern portfolio theory
- Monetary economics
- Moral hazard
- Primitive accumulation of capital
- Risk modeling
- Systemic risk
- Taleb distribution
