= We Need to Tax Billionaires =

2026 book by French economist Gabriel Zucman

- Author: Gabriel Zucman
- Original title: Les milliardaires ne paient pas d’impôt sur le revenu et nous allons y mettre fin
- Language: French
- Subjects: Political economy, economic inequality
- Publisher: Éditions du Seuil; Basic Books (UK)
- Publication date: October 2025
- English publication date: May 2026
- Media type: Print (paperback)
- ISBN: 978-1399839600
- Website: gabriel-zucman.eu/we-need-to-tax-billionaires/

We Need to Tax Billionaires is a 2026 book by French economist Gabriel Zucman.

It was first published in France as Les milliardaires ne paient pas d’impôt sur le revenu, Le Seuil.

Zucman's central proposal is that there should be an annual two per cent levy of the wealth of individuals with a net worth of more than €100 million (£87 million).
