= Lyn Squire =

American economist

Lyn Squire is an American economist who was born in South Wales. He held several positions within the World Bank's hierarchy over a 25-year career. While there, he co-authored, with Herman G. Van Der Tak, the 1975 work Economic analysis of projects. He was one of the lead authors of the World Development Report 1990: Poverty where the international $1 a day poverty line was proposed.

== Academic Service ==
- The Editor of the Middle East Development Journal
- Founding president and ex-director of the Global Development Network

== Selected publications ==
- Squire, L. (1993). Fighting poverty. American Economic Review, 83(2), 377–382.
- Lundberg, M., & Squire, L. (2003). The simultaneous evolution of growth and inequality. Economic Journal, 113(487), 326–344.
- Squire, L., & Van der Tak, H. G. (1975). Economic analysis of projects. World Bank Publications.
- Barnum, H. N., & Squire, L. (1979). An econometric application of the theory of the farm-household. Journal of Development Economics, 6(1), 79–102.
- Deininger, K., & Squire, L. (1996). A new data set measuring income inequality. World Bank Economic Review, 10(3), 565–591.
- Deininger, K., & Squire, L. (1998). New ways of looking at old issues: inequality and growth. Journal of development economics, 57(2), 259–287.
- Bruno, M., Ravallion, M., & Squire, L. (1996). Equity and growth in developing countries: old and new perspectives on the policy issues (Vol. 1563). World Bank Publications.
- Stiglitz, Joseph E. & Lyn Squire (1999) International Development: Is It Possible? Foreign Policy, 110, 138–151.
- Kanbur, R., & Squire, L. (1999). The evolution of thinking about poverty: exploring the interactions. WP 99-24 Department of Agricultural, Resource, and Managerial Economics. Cornell University,
- Milanovic, B., & Squire, L. (2005). Does tariff liberalization increase wage inequality? Some empirical evidence. World Bank Policy Research Working Paper, No. 3571, World Bank, Washington, DC.
