= A Brief History of Equality =

2022 book by economist Thomas Piketty

- Hardcover edition
- Author: Thomas Piketty
- Original title: Une breve histoire de l'égalité
- Translator: Steven Rendall
- Subjects: Political economy, economic history, economic equality, macroeconomics
- Publisher: Harvard University Press; Belknap Press
- Publication date: 2021
- English publication date: April 19, 2022
- Media type: Print (hardback)
- Pages: 288
- ISBN: 9780674273559

A Brief History of Equality is a non-fiction book by the French economist Thomas Piketty translated by Steven Rendall from the original 2021 Une brève histoire de l'égalité, about wealth redistribution, in which Piketty describes why he is optimistic about the future.

In this 288-page book targeting an audience of citizens, not economists, Piketty summarizes his two previous books, his 2014 696-page Capital in the Twenty-First Century and his 2019 1150-page book Capital and Ideology. In Capital, Piketty said that a possible remedy for inequality lay in a "global tax on wealth". In A Brief History, he developed the concept of a progressive increase in the tax on the wealthy.

== Reviews ==
In her Financial Times' review, economist Diane Coyle said that in A Brief History, Piketty advocates for politico-economic change to reduce inequalities but does not describe practical solutions for achieving that goal.

The Literary Review described the book as "an activist's history"—a manifesto as well as an overview of the past.

In his review in The Wall Street Journal, Tunku Varadarajan, a fellow of the American Enterprise Institute (AEI), said that he doubts that—without capitalism—the erosion of inequality and developments in economics and technology that Piketty described could have happened.

While Piketty did not make predictions about the future, his work—which also includes his previous publications such as Capital in the Twenty-First Century—is "partly responsible" for the move away from the "hypercapitalism" of the twenty-first century, according to Columbia Journalism School's Nicholas Lemann in his review for The New York Times.

Piketty condensed twenty years of his research into 300 pages with the goal of making it more accessible to a wider readership than Capital in the Twenty-First Century, according to Antoine Reverchon in his Le Monde book review. Reverchon said that Piketty's effort was worthwhile at a time when the left is mindlessly attempting to bring too many issues together under the same umbrella—"environmentalism, reformism, feminism, post-colonialism, anti-capitalism". Piketty calls for the state to increase access to quality health care, education, employment through the progressive implementation of taxation on the most wealthy. He also called for a "decommodification" of certain sectors that have become privatized including education, health, transport and energy. Piketty recognizes the real and historic fears of Soviet socialism and central planning—his socialism is participatory.
