= Lucas Chancel =

French economist

- Born: 1987 (age 38–39); Grenoble, France

Academic background
- Education: Sciences Po, London School of Economics, Ecole Polytechnique, Imperial College (MSc); School for Advanced Studies in the Social Sciences Université Paris Sciences et Lettres (PhD)
- Doctoral advisor: Thomas Piketty

Academic work
- Discipline: Public economics Climate change
- Institutions: Paris School of Economics; Sciences Po
- Website: Lucas Chancel

Lucas Chancel (born in 1987 in Grenoble) is a French economist. He is Codirector and Senior economist at the World Inequality Lab of the Paris School of Economics and teaches at Sciences Po. He is also Codirector of the World Inequality Database and Research fellow at the Institute for Sustainable Development and International Relations. He works on global inequality, European political economy and Sustainable development. He authored and co-authored several books on these topics.

== Career ==
Lucas Chancel pursued his undergraduate studies in social sciences at Sciences Po as well as Pierre et Marie Curie University in Paris, where he obtained a Bachelor in Physics and applied to earth sciences. He earned an M.Sc. in Economics and public policy from the Ecole Polytechnique, ENSAE and Sciences Po and pursues his scientific training at Imperial College London where he obtained an M.Sc. in engineering specialized in renewable energy. He earns his PhD in economics from the School for Advances Studies in the Social Sciences and Paris Sciences Lettres University in 2018. He wrote his dissertation entitled "Essays on global income and pollution inequality" under the supervision of Thomas Piketty and obtained the special mention of the Jury at the Best PhD Thesis prize of Paris Sciences Lettres University. He also studied at the London School of Economics and at Jawaharlal Nehru University in New Delhi.

In 2011, he joined the Institute for Sustainable Development and International Relations and started to teach at Sciences Po where he currently teaches a Master-level course entitled Global inequality and sustainability. He joins the World Inequality Lab at the Paris School of Economics in 2015. He has given lectures, conducted conferences on global inequality and sustainability including at the United Nations Headquarters in New York.

He collaborates with modern artists, including Revital Cohen and Tuur Van Balen, on arts and social science projects related to inequality or the economy.

Lucas Chancel is an op-ed contributor to French newspapers Le Monde and Libération and intervenes in the international media to discuss economic developments and present his research findings.

He defended a global progressive tax on carbon emissions. In 2017, he published his first book in French "Insoutenables inégalités: pour une justice sociale et environnementale", a "reflexion on the complex articulation of the socio-economic sphere and environmental sphere" according to French journal Le Monde. The book is translated in English by Harvard University Press in 2020 under the title "Unsustainable Inequality: Social justice and the environment". In 2018, he served as general coordinator of the World Inequality Report, published in a dozen languages and widely discussed in the global media. In 2019, he co-drafted, along with Thomas Piketty and other intellectuals, the Treaty for the Democratization of Europe. He is lead researcher of a chapter of Human Development Report 2019 on global inequality and poverty. In 2020, he argued in favor of debt mutualization between France, Italy and Spain in the context of the Coronavirus crisis.

== Bibliography ==
- Chancel, Lucas (2017). Insoutenables inégalités: Pour une justice sociale et environnementale. Les Petits Matins.
- Chancel, Lucas (2020). Unsustainable Inequalities: Social Justice and the Environment. Harvard University Press.
- with Manon Bouju, Anne-Laure Delatte, Stéphanie Hennette, Thomas Piketty, Guillaume Sacriste, Antoine Vauchez (2019). Treaty for the Democratization of Europe. Seuil.
- with Facundo Alvaredo, Thomas Piketty, Emmanuel Saez, Gabriel Zucman (2018). World Inequality Report. Seuil.
- with Facundo Alvaredo, Thomas Piketty, Emmanuel Saez, Gabriel Zucman (2018). World Inequality Report. Harvard University Press.
