= Unsustainable Inequalities =

2020 book by Lucas Chancel

- Author: Lucas Chancel
- Publisher: Belknap Press / Harvard University Press
- Publication date: 2020-06-10
- ISBN: 9780674984653

Unsustainable Inequalities: Social Justice and the Environment is a non-fiction book published in 2020 by French economist and researcher Lucas Chancel. The book explores the intricate relationship between social inequalities and environmental degradation, offering a comprehensive analysis of the global challenges posed by these intertwined issues. Chanel explains how economic inequality shapes who benefits from environmental resources and who bears the cost of pollution and ecological damage. He shows that wealthier individuals and nations contribute more to environmental harm while poorer communities are often the most affected by its consequences.

Chancel argues for the necessity of addressing social justice and environmental sustainability in tandem in order to achieve lasting and equitable solutions. He emphasizes that environmental policies cannot succeed if they ignore inequality and that social policies must also consider their environmental impact.

== Overview ==
Unsustainable Inequalities examines the complex interplay between social and environmental issues, focusing on the ways in which social inequalities contribute to environmental degradation and hinder effective action against climate change. The book covers a range of topics, including income inequality, access to resources, environmental racism, and the disproportionate impacts of climate change on marginalized communities. Chancel proposes a framework for incorporating social justice into environmental policy and emphasizes the importance of rethinking economic models to prioritize both social equity and environmental sustainability.

== Background and Author ==
Lucas Chancel is a French economist and researcher specializing in income inequality, environmental policy, and sustainable development. He is the Co-Director of the World Inequality Lab at the Paris School of Economics and a Senior Research Fellow at the Institute for Sustainable Development and International Relations. Chancel's academic and policy work focuses on the intersection of social and environmental issues, and his research has contributed significantly to the understanding of these complex relationships.

== Reception ==
Unsustainable Inequalities was ranked the Best Book of 2020 in economics according to the Financial Times.
