= Julia Cagé =

French economist (born 1984)

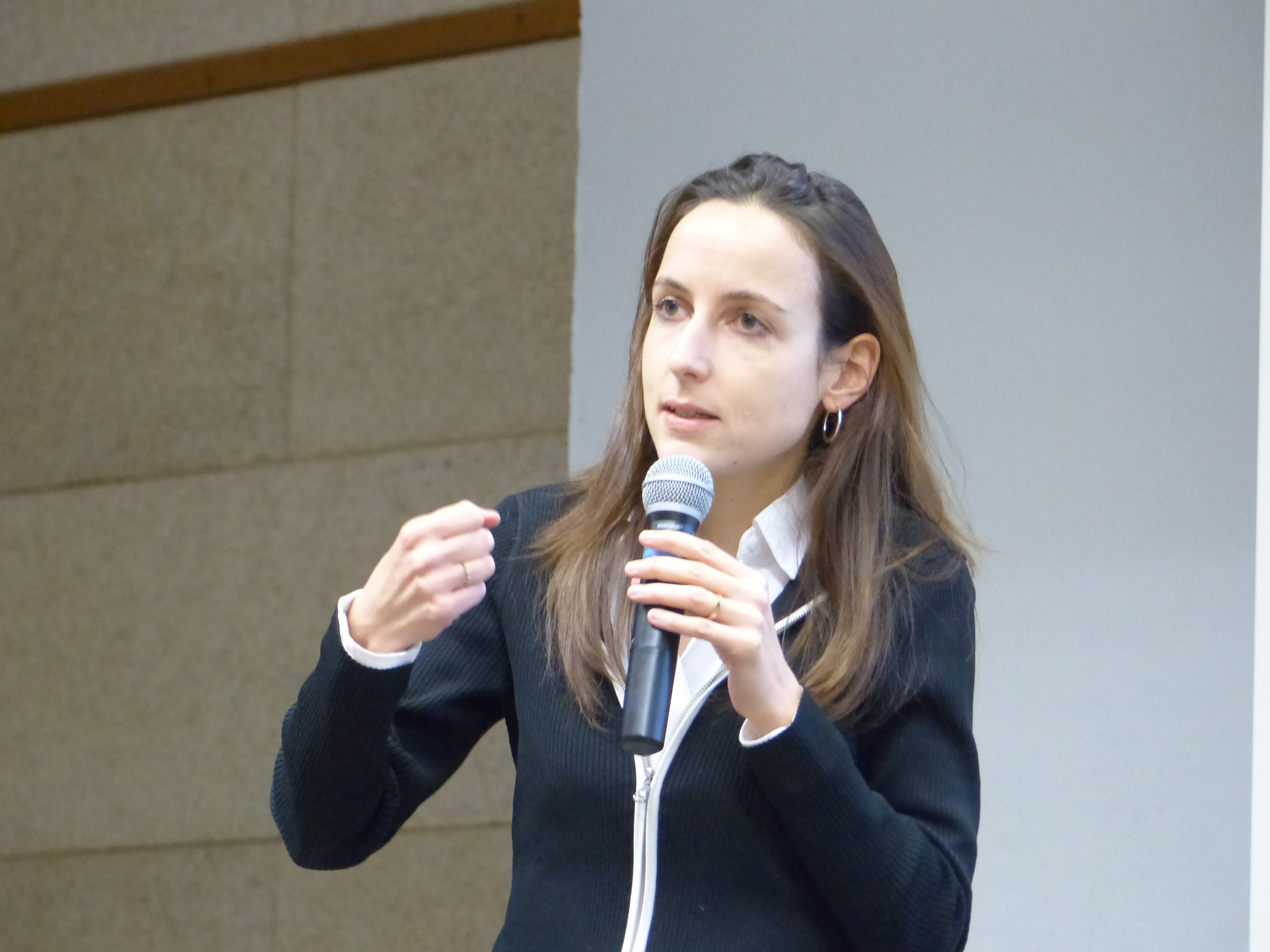
- Cagé in 2017
- Born: 17 February 1984 (age 42); Metz, France
- Spouse: Thomas Piketty (m. 2014)

Academic background
- Education: École normale supérieure Pantheon-Sorbonne University (BA); Paris School of Economics (MA); Harvard University (PhD)
- Influences: Nathan Nunn, Daniel Cohen

Academic work
- Discipline: Economics
- Institutions: Sciences Po

Julia Cagé (French: [kaʒe]; born 17 February 1984) is a French economist specializing in development economics, political economy, and economic history. In 2025, she was awarded the Yrjö Jahnsson Award.

== Early life ==
Julia Cagé has a twin sister, Agathe Cagé who is a technocrat and an advisor to Najat Vallaud-Belkacem.

Cagé attended prep school in letters and social sciences at Lycée Thiers in Marseille. From 2005 to 2010 she and her twin studied at the École normale supérieure of Paris.

From 2010 to 2014 she was a doctoral student in economics at Harvard. She received her PhD in economics there in 2014 under Alberto Alesina, Nathan Nunn and Andrei Shleifer. She also defended a thesis at the School for Advanced Studies in the Social Sciences on Essays in the Political Economy of Information and Taxation, under the direction of Daniel Cohen.

== Career ==
Since July 2014, Julia Cagé has been an assistant professor of Economics at Sciences Po Paris. In 2018, she became the Co-director of the Laboratory for Interdisciplinary Evaluation of Public Policies (LIEPP) "Evaluation of Democracy" research group.

== Research ==
=== Saving the media ===
In February 2015, Julia Cagé published Saving the media: Capitalism, crowdfunding and democracy in French. By the end of 2016, it had been published in 10 other languages.

This book reviews existing models for funding the media, evaluates the strengths and weaknesses of each, and proposes a new structure for "saving the media", which she calls a "Nonprofit Media Organization (NMO)". She argues that, the fundamental problem with existing media organizations is that they either (1) have not been self-sustaining or (2) have such inherent conflicts of interest that their coverage becomes a threat to democracy.

Her NMO is a charitable foundation but with democratic governance, limiting the power of the major donors while encouraging crowdfunding.

This book was widely reviewed in the mainstream French media: Les Échos, Libération, Télérama, Les Inrocks, La Croix, Mediapart, Alternatives économiques, France Culture, Europe 1, France 24 and France inter.

By 5 November 2016 it was available in translation into 10 other languages: English, Chinese, German, Italian, Japanese, Korean, Portuguese, Serbian, Spanish, and Turkish; it's now also available in Romanian.

In this book, she proposes a new model for organizing media: a nonprofit media organization (NMO), which combines aspects of both a joint-stock company and a foundation. The goal is to allow sharing and democratic renewal of power and funding. Readers, journalists and other, "crowdfunders", would see their contributions in capital recognized by an increase in voting rights at the expense of the power of the largest shareholders. Media would thus benefit from open donations and reductions in taxes. Cagé claims these will replace the current media subsidies, which are often opaque and ineffective, with a "neutral, transparent and citizen" support system. Éric Fottorino claimed that this model will not likely work well for large media, which he believes will not function well without shareholders, who will demand influence in proportion to their investment.

This book is based on Cagé's analysis of the historical evolution of the media and their modes of governance and financing in Europe and the United States since the beginning of the twentieth century. This includes previous work on the impact of sometimes excessive competition between media organization, focusing especially on the experience of the regional daily press in France since 1945.

This book received the 2016 prize for a book discussing research in the media by the Assises du journalisme (French journalism foundation).

Cagé and Huet (2021) provide a detailed analysis of changes in law, especially in France, that might improve independence of the media, as recommended by Cagé's earlier work.

=== Globalization and financing public goods ===
In a 2012 article written with Lucie Gadenne, Cagé showed that trade liberalization in developing countries generally “led to larger and longer-lived decreases in total tax revenues in developing countries since the 1970s than in rich countries in the 19th and early 20th centuries. The fall in total tax revenues lasts more than ten years in half the developing countries in our sample.” This led to serious reductions in the funds available for public goods indispensable for economic growth and development: education, health, infrastructure, etc.

=== Media in Africa ===
Work coauthored by Valeria Rueda studied the long-term consequences of the introduction of printing presses on the development of media in different African countries. They studied the impact of protestant missions in Africa based on their locations in 1903, some of which had their own printing presses to print bibles and educational materials. Cagé and Rueda found that “within regions close to missions, proximity to a printing press is associated with higher newspaper readership, trust, education, and political participation.” They also noted that missions without printing presses failed to show comparable improvements. This extended her 2014 analysis of specific issues and challenges encountered in development specific to Africa, noting that this process in Africa may have been different from the comparable experience in other regions of the world.

=== Development aid, international trade and reputations of countries ===
In a series of articles written between 2009 and 2014, Cagé argued that development assistance is more effective in countries with greater transparency of information. She said that international aid organizations fail to give adequate weight to the quality of local media and democratic processes.

In 2015 Cagé and Dorothée Rouzet documented how national brands can have a substantial impact on international trade. For this they study the coverage of different countries in the media of importing countries. This work displayed a new way to understand the importance of information and credible media for economic development.

=== Tax revenues and the fiscal cost of trade liberalization, 1792–2006 ===
In August 2018, Julia Cage and Lucie Gadenne wrote an article that looked on the impact of trade liberations of government revenues. They looked into how countries recovered their tax revenues that were lost by liberalizing trade via other sources of revenue. They found that trade liberalization led to larger and longer declines in tax revenues in developing countries versus today’s (19th and 20th century) rich countries. Their results implied that a decrease in trade tax affected the government’s ability to provide public services in developing countries in a negative way.

== Politics ==
=== Supported François Hollande for President of France in 2012 ===
In the French presidential election of 2012, Cagé was one of nine economists publicly supporting the candidacy of François Hollande due to his platform, especially regarding economic growth and employment.

=== Supported Benoît Hamon for President of France in 2017 ===
In January 2016, in the run-up to the presidential election in 2017, Cagé was one of eleven initiators of a call for primary on the left. On 24 January 2017 she coauthored a call to support Benoît Hamon for the 2017 citizen's primary, entitled "For a credible and bold universal income." La Tribune tweeted that these economists do not support a real universal income. Cagé replied that La Tribune was hallucinating, and "We (Saez, Chancel, Landais...) wrote a call to support a universal income."

After the second round of the primary and the election of Benoît Hamon, Thomas Piketty provided more details behind the terms of payment of the proposal for a basic income supported by the call previously issued by him, Cagé, and others. Cagé became Hamon's chief economist.

== Personal life ==
In 2014 she married the economist Thomas Piketty.

== Other activities ==
In November 2015, Cagé was named as one of five “qualified personalities” on the Board of Directors of Agence France-Presse. She is also a member of the French Commission économique de la Nation (similar to the Council of Economic Advisors in the U.S.). She has been a columnist for Alternatives économiques and France Culture and the show Le monde d'après sur France 3 [The world according to France 3].

In 2020 she founded "Un Bout du Monde" ("A Corner of the World") "to organize a democratic reconquest of the media" to start executing a plan to implement the vision of her (2016) Saving the Media. In 2021 the name was changed to "Un Bout des Média".

== Selected bibliography ==
- Cagé, Julia (2016). Saving the media: Capitalism, crowdfunding and democracy. Harvard U. Pr. ISBN 9780674659759.
- Cagé, Julia (19 December 2019). "Sciences Po". Sciences Po Department of Economics. Sciences Po.
- Cagé, Julia; Huet, Benoît (2021), Information is a public good: Refound media ownership [L'information est un bien public: Refonder la propriété des médias] (in French), Éditions du Seuil, Wikidata Q117826247
