= Capital and Ideology =

2019 book by Thomas Piketty

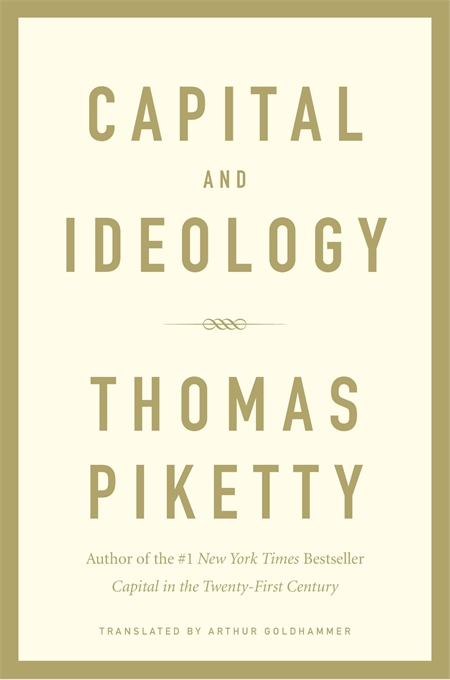
- Author: Thomas Piketty
- Original title: Capital et Idéologie
- Translator: Arthur Goldhammer (English)
- Language: French
- Subjects: Political economy, economic history, economic inequality, macroeconomics
- Publisher: Éditions du Seuil; Harvard University Press
- Publication date: 12 September 2019
- English publication date: March 2020
- Media type: Print (Hardback)
- Pages: 1150 pp.
- ISBN: 978-2-02-133804-1 (France)

Capital and Ideology (French: Capital et Idéologie) is a 2019 book by French economist Thomas Piketty. Capital and Ideology follows Piketty's 2013 book Capital in the Twenty-First Century, which focused on wealth and income inequality in Europe and the United States.

Described by Piketty as "in large part a sequel" to its predecessor, Capital and Ideology has a wider scope, and Piketty has expressed his preference for the 2019 book. In the book, Piketty outlines potential means of redistributing wealth, and explores historical and contemporary justifications for inequality. Paul Krugman wrote of the book, "In Marxian dogma, a society's class structure is determined by underlying, impersonal forces, technology and the modes of production that technology dictates. Piketty, however, sees inequality as a social phenomenon, driven by human institutions. Institutional change, in turn, reflects the ideology that dominates society: 'Inequality is neither economic nor technological; it is ideological and political.'" Methods for redistributing wealth proposed in the book include the "inheritance for all", a payment distributed to citizens by their country at the age of 25. The book is censored in the People's Republic of China.

== Reviews ==
The book has received mixed reviews from economists, scholars and pundits. The book also generated attention because Piketty refused to censor parts of it, which led to it not being published in mainland China.

Robert Shortt of RTÉ.ie rated the book four stars out of five. He wrote, "Some of his conclusions [...] can at times sound simplistic, even glib", referring to Piketty's proposal that pooling sovereign debt in the Eurozone would reduce member states' debt interest payments and his criticism of the much greater spending on interest payments than on a program like Erasmus+. Shortt also said that the history "sometimes takes away from the very real and pertinent questions Piketty raises" about modern politics. However, Shortt said that Capital and Ideology still "goes a long way towards framing what is happening both here and abroad in a broad historical and political context."

In Kirkus Reviews, the book was billed as a "deftly argued case for a new kind of socialism that, while sure to inspire controversy, bears widespread discussion." William Davies of The Guardian wrote that the book "is occasionally naive (it will bug the hell out of historians and anthropologists) but in a provocative fashion, as if to say: if inequality isn't justified, why not change it?" and that Piketty's policy recommendations "are not the most arresting features of the book." However, Davies also wrote, "Amid the distraction and perpetual outrage of our dysfunctional public sphere, this enlightenment confidence in empirics feels beamed in from another age. It also makes for a unique scholarly edifice, which will be impossible to ignore."

Marshall Steinbaum of Boston Review stated that in comparison to Capital in the Twenty-First Century the work "loses much of the economic theory, but it gains a vast wealth of historical, sociological, and political detail". He wrote that the book "systematically demolishes [the] self-serving conceit" of the economy as a natural force uninfluenced by ideas on how it should work. While Steinbaum said that Piketty's narrative that left-wing parties became parties of the educated rather than the working class is flawed "because the working class is getting more educated", Steinbaum lauded Piketty's engagement with political science, writing, "Few economists are as methodologically curious and versatile, much less as adept."

Geoff Mann praised Capital and Ideology in London Review of Books. He disputed Piketty's claim that social democracy in the 20th century was intended to transcend private property and capitalism. However, Mann said that the book "proves conclusively that [the idea that economic growth will fix the inequality problem] was an illusion", and concluded, "Whether or not his revolution without revolutionaries can get us where we need to go, his analysis of how we got here demands our attention." The Hindu's G. Sampath wrote, "Contradicting the claims of Hayekian market fundamentalists, Piketty shows, through page after page of charts, graphs and histograms, how unfettered capitalism in 19th century Europe led to levels of inequality not seen anywhere except in quasi-slave societies. [...] The singular value of this book may well be its power to revive research and activism that re-embed economic problems in a social and civic substrate."

The New Republic's Robin Kaiser-Schatzlein argued, "Piketty's own imagination of new worlds is grounded in a rigorous and detailed analysis of the institutions that have existed in the real world. [...] He is uncovering ideas that have worked before. They could work again." In The Washington Post, James Kwak approved of Piketty's explanation for the rise of far-right politics and wrote that "as long as the Democratic Party muddles along with the same old ideology of market-driven growth and supposed equality of opportunity, our political system will remain defined by two parties dominated by competing segments of the economic elite."

Ryan Cooper of The Week praised the book. Cooper said that Piketty sometimes "struggles with organizing his titanic collection of arguments and evidence", but found convincing Piketty's discussion of the rightward shift in 21st century politics and dubbed Capital and Ideology "a fascinating, essential study both of where we came from and of two possible paths forward: how we might create a better future for all human society, and the dark possibilities should we fail. [...] on his key point of the brute necessity of a reborn international left, Piketty is inarguably correct." Keith Johnson of Foreign Policy wrote, "The reams of economic data he unearths are eye-opening; many of his proposed solutions seem eye-rolling in the current climate. [...] Piketty's latest effort is a very welcome, very controversial, and, in another time and place, possibly even constructive contribution."

Conversely, a reviewer in The Economist said that Piketty "draws on an impressive range of historical statistics" and that, compared to most post-Marxist critiques, Capital and Ideology is "readable. The prose is pithy and light on theory." But the reviewer described the economist's account of ideology by elites throughout history as lesser than accounts by thinkers like Theodor W. Adorno and Michel Foucault because Piketty "flits between case studies" and suggests that "elites are only ever self-serving"; the reviewer also said that he insufficiently deals with concerns that "sky-high wealth taxes would play havoc with incentives, reducing investment and entrepreneurship [...] it is hard not to conclude that, deep down, Mr Piketty believes the worth of a society is measured by its Gini coefficient alone."

The Guardian's Paul Mason said that Piketty's discussions of history and ideologies show ignorance of the "methodological debates that rage" in the field of history. The journalist also argued that "Piketty's solutions [for the rise of nativism and xenophobia] are perfunctory [...] a survey of 'red wall' seats found they [...] reject attempts to take money from the modestly well-off and even from billionaires". Summing up Piketty's central idea as taxing capitalism out of existence, Mason concluded, "My objection is not that it is too radical but, lacking any explanation of which social forces might enact it, not radical enough."

Paul Collier of New Statesman wrote, "There is much of value here and many of its ideas are insightful. But in the end, if this becomes the agenda of the left, it will exchange one cul-de-sac for another." Collier claims that Piketty "conflates opposition to open borders with hatred of immigrants". Collier also said the northern working class in the U.K. would likely prefer a tax on the capital appreciation of the ABs who own London property to Piketty's recommendations, and that "it is ethically better that you should save to help your children rather than lavish consumption on yourself now".

Cole Stangler of The Nation discussed how Piketty differs from Marx and Engels, in that Piketty views major transformations in economics as shaped by various factors (like religious beliefs, sense of national belonging, and crises) without reducing it to a singular, higher order cause. Whereas Marx and Engels famously described the history of all society as a history mainly of class struggle (however, they did not preclude social factors; rather, they contended that such factors belonged to the dialectic of Base and superstructure). Stangler wrote that while some might find nuanced Piketty's lack of identification of a central force and his unpacking of each major transformation "on its own terms, insisting on a multitude of alternative paths that might have been followed at any given moment [...] others may be put off by its unwillingness to dig in and take sides." Stangler also argued against the privileging of ideological struggle over class struggle by arguing that some groups are selfish and "simply aren't interested in a good-faith debate [...] one can't help but wonder if [Piketty] underplays the extent to which individuals' access to and relationship with wealth [...] influences how they look at the world and engage in politics."

Tyler Cowen's words were mostly unfavorable. While he argued that there is a "considerable sum of useful and valuable material" and praised as "carefully done" Piketty's history of wealth and property accumulation, Cowen dismissed his commentary on recent events as "distorted and unreliable. There is massive distrust of the wealthy in this book, and virtually no distrust of concentrated state power." Cowen suggested that the high innovation and, according to him, higher real wages in the United States compared to Western Europe stand as evidence against Piketty's worldview. Till Breyer and Felix Kersting reported in Critical Inquiry that his "concrete historical analysis seems to run somewhat counter to” his view of ideas as autonomous, and actually supports the view that crises and struggles are needed for changes in ideological structures.

In Financial Times, Raghuram Rajan wrote that Capital and Ideology "reflects a prodigious amount of scholarship" but would not persuade those who disagreed. Rajan said that studies had debunked Piketty's implicit assumption that today's rich are largely the "idle rich"; that the high growth from 1950 to 1980 was dependent on a number of factors that are unlikely to be repeated; that "we never actually ran the high-tax experiment" because tax loopholes were abundant in that period; and that other factors besides tax policy determine inequality. Rajan also argued, of the author's vision of participatory socialism, that "it is unclear what would offer a countervailing balance to an overpowerful state [...] Most people will have little sense of control over their futures." Rajan said, "Inequality is a real problem today, but it is the inequality of opportunity, of access to capabilities, of place, not just of incomes and wealth."

Economic historian Harold James wrote that "Piketty largely leaves war and war finance out of his account, and his extensive discussion of property and the French Revolution amazingly omits the assignat inflation. Piketty begins with an appeal to social scientists that they learn more history, but choosing which bits of history to include and which to exclude is always likely to be a matter for contestation."

Leonid Bershidsky of Bloomberg said, in response to the high proposed taxes, that "Piketty's book doesn't do a good job of explaining how an inevitable collapse in property prices will affect the tax base and investment — or, indeed, in what form assets will be parceled out if the rich can't sell 90% of their assets immediately." Bershidsky also wrote, "I'm pretty sure Piketty overestimates the role inequality has played in the recent rise of [political forces that want to focus on identity and tradition rather than any economic vision]." Ingrid Harvold Kvangraven, however, wrote that the book is too tepid, stating that Piketty ignores "key Marxist insights about dynamics such as the profit motive, unequal access to and ability to develop technology, and labour-squeezing cost-cutting."

In Paul Krugman's unfavorable review, he praised the Pikettian method of using "a combination of extrapolation and guesswork to produce quantitative estimates for eras that predate modern data collection" as applied "to very good effect" in Capital and Ideology. But he also questions whether Piketty knows enough to have constructed valid claims about the dozens of societies he discusses, as well as whether all of the case studies strengthen Piketty's core argument that rising inequality throughout history is fundamentally due to ideology and politics rather than economics and technology (with Krugman noting Evsey Domar's claims on the reasons for serfdom in Russia). Krugman also argued that the white working class in the U.S. would probably not support Piketty's policies. Despite saying that "the book does advance at least the outline of a grand theory of inequality, which might be described as Marx on his head", Krugman concluded by asserting that he was unsure what the book's central message was.

Ewan McGaughey in Oeconomia described Capital and Ideology as "an encyclopaedic, data driven, and intensely rewarding work, spanning the world's modern history and contemporary politics", but sought to emphasise that "inequality of economic power is even more extreme than inequality of wealth and income". On top of the lack of workplace democracy on which Piketty focuses, there is also a need to democratise capital, by ensuring the true investors in pensions or mutual funds can control votes taken by asset managers or banks. Largely agreeing with Piketty, he argued that "the legal construction of markets can go very far to pre-empt unjustified inequality, before redistributive taxation", but stressed that the meaning of a just society goes further than a fair distribution of wealth, and ensures everyone can develop their potential to the fullest. "Perhaps the greatest achievement of Piketty's work", he concludes "could be to bring economics firmly back to the values in the Universal Declaration of Human Rights."

== See also ==
- Capital in the Twenty-First Century (2013)
