= Middle East Development Journal =

- Discipline: Middle Eastern studies
- Language: English
- Edited by: Raimundo Soto

Publication details
- History: 2009–present
- Publisher: Routledge on behalf of the Economic Research Forum
- Frequency: Biannual
- Open access: Hybrid
- Impact factor: 0.5 (2022)

Standard abbreviations
- ISO 4: Middle East Dev. J.

Indexing
- ISSN: 1793-8120 (print); 1793-8171 (web)
- LCCN: 2009207596
- OCLC no.: 609701316

Links
- Journal homepage; Online access; Online archive

The Middle East Development Journal is a biannual peer-reviewed academic journal covering Middle Eastern studies, including applied economics, political science, and sociology. It was established in 2009 and is published by Routledge on behalf of the Economic Research Forum.

== Abstracting and indexing ==
The journal is abstracted and indexed in EBSCO databases, EconLit, the Emerging Sources Citation Index, and Scopus. According to the Journal Citation Reports, the journal has a 2022 impact factor of x.x.
