= Clive Crook =

British journalist

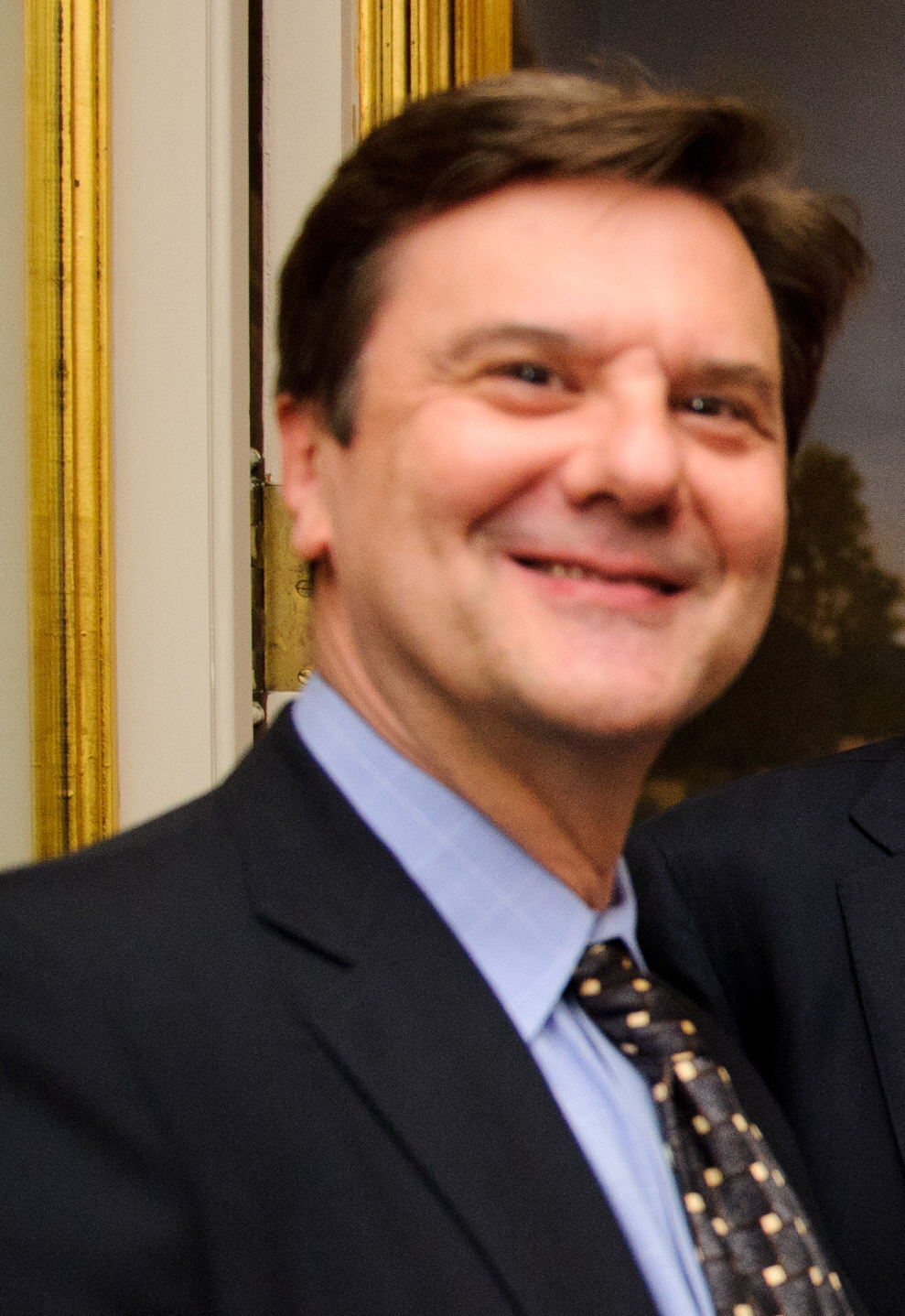
- Crook at the Financial Times Meet the Editor reception, Washington, D.C. (2011)
- Born: 1955 (age 70–71); Yorkshire, England
- Occupation: Columnist

Clive Crook (born 1955) is a former columnist for the Financial Times and the National Journal; a former senior editor at The Atlantic Monthly, and now writes a column and editorials for Bloomberg News. For twenty years he held various editorial positions at The Economist, including deputy editor from 1993 to 2005.

In 2006, he co-chaired the Copenhagen Consensus project, framing global development priorities for the coming decades. He has co-authored Globalisation: Making Sense of an Integrating World: Reasons, Effects and Challenges for the Economist Group.

== Background ==
He was born in Yorkshire and raised in Lancashire. He was educated at Bolton School, and graduated from Magdalen College, Oxford, and the London School of Economics. He has served as a consultant to The World Bank and worked as an official at Britain's Her Majesty's Treasury.

== Publications ==
- Crook, Clive; Bishop, Matthew; Peet, John; Beddoes, Zanny Minton; Guest, Robert (2002-02-21). Globalisation: Making Sense of an Integrating World: Reasons, Effects and Challenges (Economist). Economist Books. p. 336. ISBN 978-1-86197-348-1.
- Crook, Clive (1992). "Third World Economic Development". In David R. Henderson (ed.). Concise Encyclopedia of Economics (1st ed.). Library of Economics and Liberty. OCLC 317650570, 50016270, 163149563
