= The Hidden Wealth of Nations =

2013 book by economist Gabriel Zucman

The Hidden Wealth of Nations: The Scourge of Tax Havens
- First edition (French)
- Author: Gabriel Zucman
- Original title: La richesse cachée des nations
- Translator: Teresa Lavender Fagan
- Language: French
- Subject: Capitalism, economic history, economic inequality, political economy, Government Finance, International and Comparative Economics, Money and Banking, International Law
- Genre: Non fiction
- Publisher: Éditions du Seuil; University of Chicago Press (US)
- Publication date: 2013
- English publication date: September 22, 2015
- Media type: Print (Hardback):
- ISBN: 978-0226245423
- Website: https://gabriel-zucman.eu/hidden-wealth

The Hidden Wealth of Nations: The Scourge of Tax Havens is a 2013 book by French economist Gabriel Zucman, which popularized the concept of both the tax haven and corporate tax haven. The French publication was translated into English by Teresa Lavender Fagan. The foreword was written by Thomas Piketty, Zucman's PhD supervisor. Both Piketty and Zucman are critical of capitalism in its present form. Where Piketty's best-selling Capital in the Twenty-First Century was the catalyst for debate about inequality, Zucman targets individual and corporate tax havens. According to Zucman's research, US$7.6 trillion representing about eight percent of global net financial wealth, is held in offshore accounts where no taxes are collected.

== Publication and reception ==
According to The New York Times Book Review one of the "strong" virtues of The Hidden Wealth of Nations, is that it sheds light on a potential area for significant reforms on an issues with which many may agree,"You might believe that the tax system should be made more progressive, or you might believe that it should be made less so. But whatever you think, you are unlikely to support a situation in which trillions of dollars are hardly taxed at all." While The Atlantic described Zucman's The Hidden Wealth of Nations as "carefully considered and closely argued", there was criticism that "his optimism about initiatives" like the much despised Foreign Accounts Tax Compliance Act" (FATCA) and his "neglect" of certain "conflicts of interest within nations". The review noted that Zucman was "at the beginning of what promises to be a brilliant career" − Zucman is a 28-year-old University of California, Berkeley economist. Tax havens essentially allow "world's wealthiest individuals and firms" to "steal revenue from other nations". Those who avoid paying their fair share of taxes shift the burden to ordinary people. The Atlantic reviews said that Zucman's "main achievement" was to quantify the theft: "$200 billion in state revenues lost through private individuals' use of tax havens, plus another $130 billion in losses created by U.S. firms booking their profits offshore." Bloomberg Businessweek described it "this year's Piketty", referring to Thomas Piketty, whose best-selling "opus" Capital in the Twenty-First Century, "renewed a debate about inequality" in 2014. Piketty, who was Zucman's PhD. supervisor, wrote the foreword to Hidden Wealth. Zucman, like Piketty is criticizing capitalism and his target is tax havens that allow the wealthiest individuals and corporations to avoid paying taxes on $7.6 trillion which represents about "8 percent of the world's net financial wealth".

== Contents ==
The book includes a foreword by Thomas Piketty, an introduction on how countries can respond to tax havens, a chapter on the history of tax havens from the early twentieth century until today, a description of the "missing wealth" that tax havens steal from national revenues, past errors, suggestions for a new approach and a chapter on multinational corporations that avoid taxes using tax havens.

== See also ==
- Capital in the Twenty-First Century
- Progress and Poverty
- Conduit and Sink OFCs
- Corporate tax haven
- Ireland as a tax haven
