= Gabriel Zucman =

French economist (born 1986)

- Zucman in 2025
- Born: 30 October 1986 (age 40); Paris, France
- Spouse: Claire Montialoux

Academic background
- Education: Lycée Henri-IV École normale supérieure Paris-Saclay (BSc); Paris School of Economics (MSc, PhD)
- Doctoral advisor: Thomas Piketty

Academic work
- Discipline: Public economics
- Institutions: Paris School of Economics; University of California, Berkeley; London School of Economics; EU Tax Observatory
- Notable ideas: Tax avoidance Base erosion and profit shifting Tax havens
- Awards: Best Young Economist of France (2018); John Bates Clark Medal (2023)
- Website: Gabriel Zucman; Information at IDEAS / RePEc

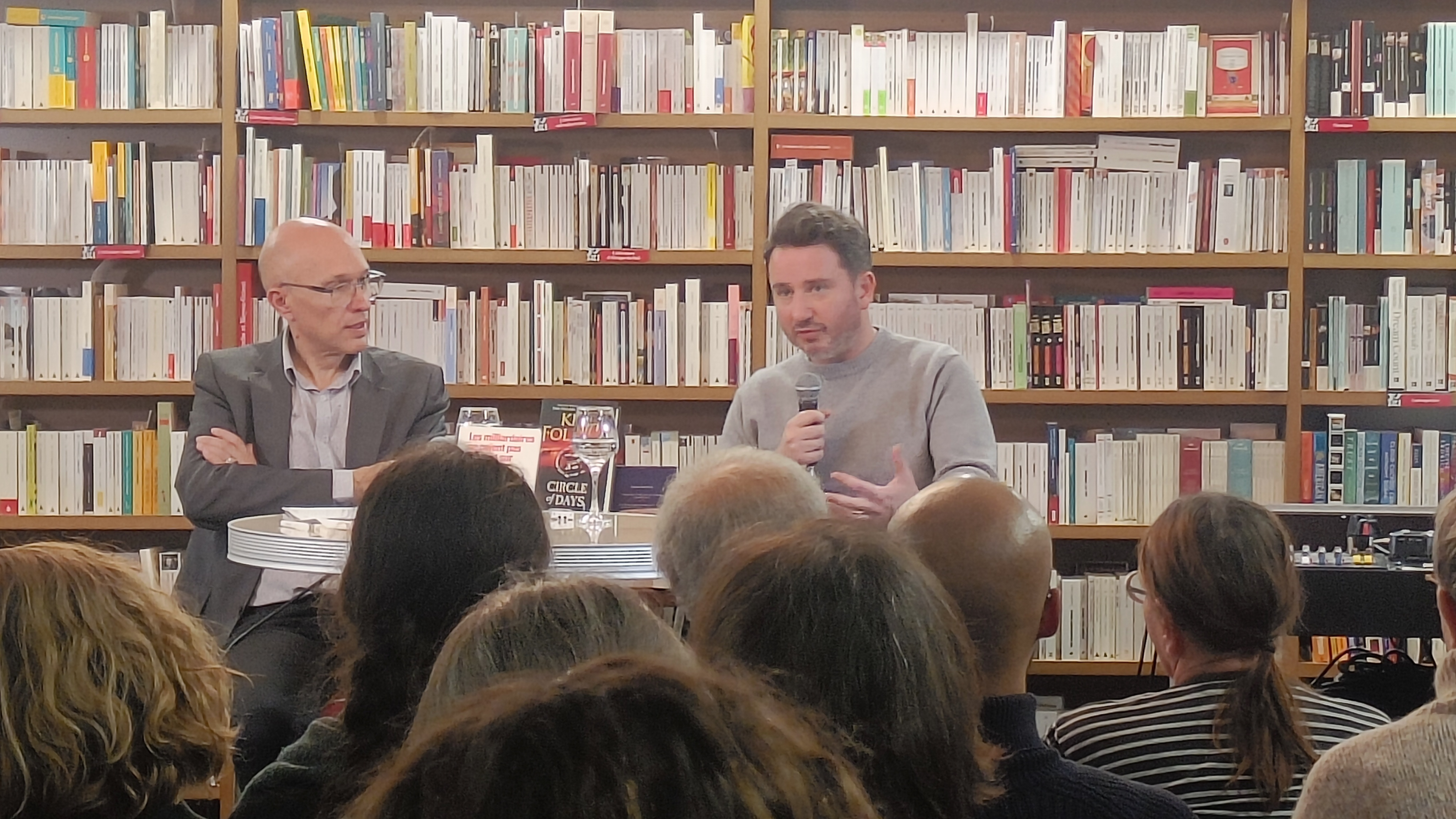
Gabriel Zucman (right) at a conference in Vincennes on October 31, 2025

Gabriel Zucman (French pronunciation: [ɡabʁijɛl zykman]; born 30 October 1986) is a French economist known for his expertise on tax havens. He has been a chaired professor at the Paris School of Economics since 2023, Summer Research Professor of Economics at the University of California, Berkeley's Goldman School of Public Policy, and the director of the EU Tax Observatory in Paris.

The author of The Hidden Wealth of Nations: The Scourge of Tax Havens (2015), Zucman is known for his research on tax havens and corporate tax havens. Zucman has argued for a global wealth tax on centimillionaires and richer high-net-worth individuals.

He is also known for his work on the quantification of the financial scale of base erosion and profit shifting (BEPS) tax avoidance techniques employed by multinationals in corporate tax havens, through which he identified Ireland as the world's largest corporate tax haven, based on profit-shifting measures, in 2018.

In 2018, Zucman was the recipient of the Prize for the Best Young Economist in France, awarded by the Cercle des économistes and Le Monde in recognition of his research on tax evasion and avoidance and their economic consequences. He was awarded the John Bates Clark Medal in 2023, a prize for economists under the age of 40.

== Early life and education ==
Zucman was born in Paris in 1986, the son of two French doctors. His mother is an immunology researcher, and his father specializes in treating HIV. He is Jewish from his father's side.

In interviews, Zucman has described the "traumatic political event of my youth" as being when Jean-Marie Le Pen reached the runoff of the 2002 French presidential election. In 2018, Zucman said of that event: "A lot of my political thinking since then has been focused on how we can avoid this disaster from happening again. So far, we've failed".

From 2005 to 2010, Zucman attended the École normale supérieure Paris-Saclay, one of France's Grandes Écoles. Thereafter, he earned an MSc degree in Economic Analysis and Policy in 2008 and a PhD in Economics in 2013, both from the Paris School of Economics. His doctoral dissertation, under the supervision of Thomas Piketty, explored whether the wealthy left France due to its wealth tax. It received the French Economic Association's award for best dissertation in 2014.

== Career ==
After finishing his studies, Zucman worked for a year as a postdoctoral scholar at the University of California at Berkeley (UC Berkeley) before accepting a position as assistant professor of economics at the London School of Economics (LSE) and the same position at UC Berkeley, being currently on leave from LSE. Moreover, Zucman has worked as co-director of the World Wealth and Income Database (WID), a database aiming at the provision of access to extensive data series on the world distribution of income and wealth, since 2015.

Besides his research and teaching activities, Zucman has refereed for several economic journals, including the Quarterly Journal of Economics, the Review of Economic Studies, Econometrica, and the Journal of Political Economy. He also co–founded and acted as editor–in–chief for Regards croisés sur l'économie, a review aimed at exposing the French general public to academic research in economics.

In 2019, the faculty at the Harvard Kennedy School of Government voted to offer Zucman a tenured position in the department, but the president and provost of Harvard University blocked it.

Zucman is the founding director of the EU Tax Observatory, an independent research laboratory hosted by the Paris School of Economics.

In 2023, he was elected as a "professeur des universités" (tenured professor) in the department of economics at the Ecole normale supérieure and at the Paris School of Economics.

In 2025, France's Socialist Party endorsed a proposal by Zucman for a 2% wealth tax targeting the top 0.01% of wealth holders in the 2026 national budget.

== Research ==
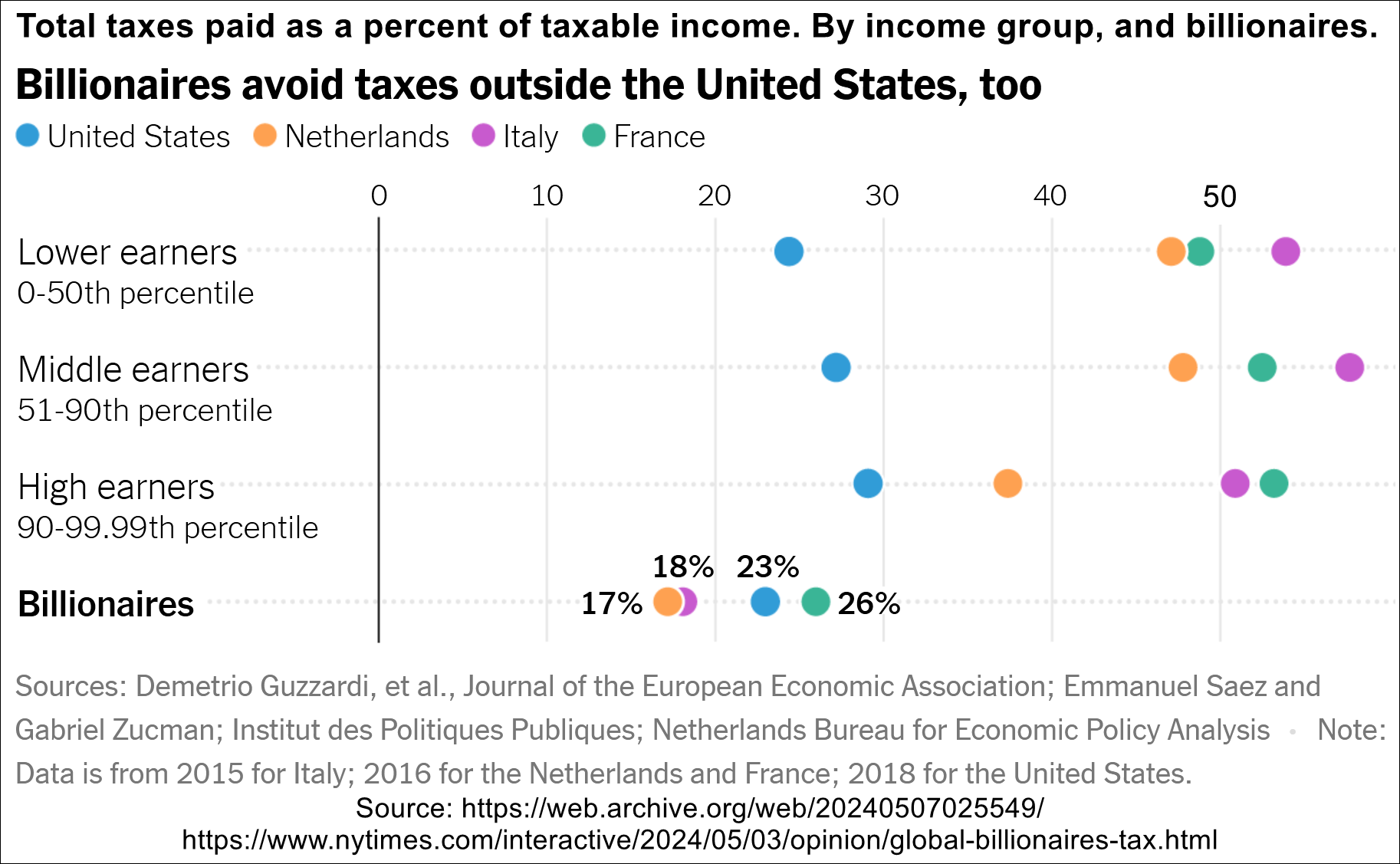
Total taxes paid as a percent of taxable income for a few countries. By income group, and billionaires. From a May 3, 2024 opinion piece of his in the New York Times.

Zucman is known for his research on tax evasion and international tax avoidance, but has made contributions to the field of public economics more broadly.

Much of Zucman's research is on issues of economic inequality. Zucman himself says, "a lot of my work is about trying to improve our measurement tools."

In August 2014 in Capital is Back, Zucman and French economist Thomas Piketty investigate the evolution of aggregate wealth-to-income ratios in the top eight developed economies, reaching back as far as 1700 in the case of the US, UK, Germany, and France, and find that wealth–income ratios have risen from about 200–300% in 1970 to 400–600% in 2010, levels unknown since the 18th and 19th centuries. Most of the change can be explained by the long-run recovery of asset prices, the slowdown of productivity, and population growth. Zucman has co-written several papers with Piketty.

A second focus is his research on tax havens. In his 2015 book The Hidden Wealth of Nations, Zucman uses the systematic anomalies in international investment positions to show that the net foreign asset positions of rich countries are generally underestimated because they don't capture most of the assets held by households in offshore tax havens. Based on his calculations, he finds about 8% of the global financial wealth of households, or $7.6 trillion, to be held in tax havens, three–quarters of which go undeclared.

In 2017–18, Zucman focused on the scale of multinational tax avoidance by base erosion and profit shifting ("BEPS") tools in the largest corporate tax havens. Zucman believes Ireland, recognised as a major corporate tax haven, is still materially underestimated by Orbis-database studies due to technical factors (even though these studies rank Ireland as the 5th largest global corporate Conduit OFC). Research co-published by Zuxcman showed that Ireland is the largest corporate tax haven in the world, even larger than the entire Caribbean corporate tax haven system. This research also showed that tax disputes between high-tax jurisdictions and corporate tax havens are extremely rare, and that tax disputes really only occur between high-tax jurisdictions.

=== The Hidden Wealth of Nations (2015) ===
The Hidden Wealth of Nations (2015), Zucman's most influential work, primarily focused on the fact that official national statistics underestimate foreign assets because offshore wealth is not properly accounted for. In his book, he used systematic anomalies in international investment positions to showcase hidden offshore wealth. These anomalies indicated that global assets exceeded global liabilities, which is theoretically impossible, thereby signaling the potential presence of missing offshore wealth. Before Zucman's work, most estimates of global wealth inequality relied on national tax records and surveys, which systematically excluded offshore assets. His methods allowed him to detect wealth that is intentionally hidden. This work changed how governments and economists understood tax evasion. It later went on to influence international G20 policy discussions and research for the World Inequality Database. His key findings were that 8% of global financial wealth is held offshore, roughly $7.6 trillion. This finding laid the groundwork for his advocacy of the global wealth tax through the EU Tax Observatory and the G20 Summit. His estimates are now used in debates about global tax transparency and have contributed to shifting tax evasion into mainstream economic and political debate. While his estimates have been widely influential, some economists have noted the difficulty of precisely measuring highly mobile and hard to find financial assets, and therefore state that offshore wealth may fluctuate with regulatory and financial changes.

Along with James R. Hines Jr. and Dhammika Dharmapala, Gabriel Zucman is noted as a leader in the study of tax havens, and his papers are amongst the most cited research on tax havens. As of October 2018, Zucman ranks 1st out of "19,829 economists whose first publication of any kind is 10 or fewer years ago", on the IDEAS/RePEc St Louis Reserve database of papers by global economists.

Much of Zucman's other research deals with the effect of the G20's crackdown on tax havens and corporate tax havens, cross–border taxation and multinational profit shifting, the long–term relationship between wealth and inheritance, and the trajectory of wealth inequality in the United States. Zucman's research and commentary have been cited by international news outlets such as The New York Times and The Guardian.

=== Tørsløv-Wier-Zucman 2018 list ===
The only tax havens from the Tørsløv-Wier-Zucman list that have ever appeared on an OECD list of tax havens are some Caribbean locations, namely The British Virgin Islands (but not the Cayman Islands). Nine of the top ten locations from the Tørsløv-Wier-Zucman list, match the top ten on the James R. Hines 2010 list (assuming that Zucman's "Caribbean" is mostly two locations, the Cayman Islands and the British Virgin Islands; Zucman lists Bermuda separately).

Missing Profits of Nations. Appendix: Table 2: Shifted Profits: Country–by–Country Estimates (2015)
Zucman Tax Haven	Rank by Profit Shifted	Corporate Profits ($bn)	Of Which: Local ($bn)	Of Which: Foreign ($bn)	Profits Shifted ($bn)	Effective Tax Rate (%)	Corp. Tax Gain/Loss (%)
Belgium	10	80	48	32	-13	19%	16%
Ireland*†	1	174	58	116	-106	4%	58%
Luxembourg*	6	91	40	51	-47	3%	50%
Malta	11	14	1	13	-12	5%	90%
Netherlands*†	5	195	106	89	-57	10%	32%
Caribbean*‡Δ	2	102	4	98	-97	2%	100%
Bermuda*‡	9	25	1	25	-24	0%	n.a
Singapore*†	3	120	30	90	-70	8%	41%
Puerto Rico	7	53	10	43	-42	3%	79%
Hong Kong*‡	8	95	45	50	-39	18%	33%
Switzerland*†	4	95	35	60	-58	21%	20%
All Others	12				-51		

(*) Identified as one of the largest 10 tax havens by James R. Hines Jr. in 2010 (the Hines 2010 List).
(†) Identified as one of the 5 Conduits (Ireland, Singapore, Switzerland, the Netherlands, and the United Kingdom), by CORPNET in 2017.
(‡) Identified as one of the largest 5 Sinks (British Virgin Islands, Luxemburg, Hong Kong, Jersey, Bermuda), by CORPNET in 2017.
(Δ) Identified on the first, and the largest, OECD 2000 list of 35 tax havens (the OECD list only contained Trinidad & Tobago by 2017); only some Caribbean territories were listed by the OECD in 2000.

=== Wealth tax on billionaires ===
Zucman researches and advocates wealth taxation as a fiscal tool to address extreme inequality and combat tax evasion in an era of rapidly growing billionaire fortunes. Specifically, he has supported a 2% wealth tax on those with wealth above €100 million. The basis of Zucman's argument is that contemporary tax systems are highly regressive at the top with the ultra-wealthy often paying effective tax rates lower than average. According to one analysis cited by Zucman, billionaires paid on the order of only ~0.3% of their wealth per year in total tax. He argues that implementing his wealth tax could substantially boost public revenue and reduce inequality with minimal adverse effects on the economy without impeding overall investment or innovation.

To enforce his wealth tax on billionaires, Zucman proposes multilateral coordination including expanding automatic exchange of financial information across jurisdictions and even developing a global asset registry to ensure the wealthy cannot relocate or hide funds to escape his tax. His proposal for a global minimum tax on billionaires was discussed by the G20 ahead of the 2024 summit.

== Personal life ==
Zucman is married to the French economist Claire Montialoux, whom he met in 2006.

== Bibliography ==
- Zucman, Gabriel (2015). The Hidden Wealth of Nations: The Scourge of Tax Havens. University of Chicago Press. ISBN 978-0226245423.
- Saez, Emmanuel; Zucman, Gabriel (2019). The Triumph of Injustice: How the Rich Dodge Taxes and How to Make Them Pay (First ed.). New York, NY: W.W. Norton & Company. ISBN 1324002727. OCLC 1121628961.
- Zucman, Gabriel (2026). We Need to Tax Billionaires. Basic Books. ISBN 978-1399839600.

== See also ==
- Double Irish arrangement
- Ireland as a tax haven
