= Thomas Piketty =

French economist (born 1971)

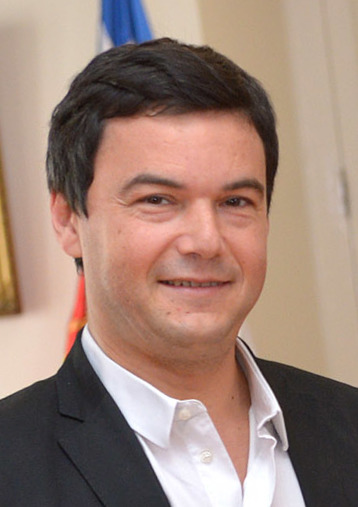
- Piketty in 2015
- Born: 7 May 1971 (age 55); Clichy, France
- Spouse: Julia Cagé (m. 2014)

Academic background
- Education: École Normale Supérieure (MSc); London School of Economics; School for Advanced Studies in the Social Sciences (joint PhD)
- Doctoral advisor: Roger Guesnerie
- Influences: Simon Kuznets, Adam Smith, John Maynard Keynes, Anthony Atkinson, Kenneth Pomeranz, Amartya Sen, Julia Cagé, Lucas Chancel, Camille Landais, Emmanuel Saez, John Rawls, Emile Durkheim, Leon Bourgeois

Academic work
- Discipline: Public economics, economic history
- Institutions: Paris School of Economics; School for Advanced Studies in the Social Sciences; London School of Economics; Massachusetts Institute of Technology
- Awards: Honorary Doctorate, Clarivate Citation Laureates (2023); University of Johannesburg (2015); Medalla Rectoral, Universidad de Chile (2015); Yrjö Jahnsson Award (2013); Prix du meilleur jeune économiste de France (2002)
- Website: Information at IDEAS / RePEc

Thomas Piketty (French: [tɔmɑ pikɛti]; born 7 May 1971) is a French economist who is a professor of economics at the School for Advanced Studies in the Social Sciences (EHESS), associate chair at the Paris School of Economics (PSE) and Centennial Professor of Economics in the International Inequalities Institute at the London School of Economics (LSE).

Piketty's work focuses on public economics, in particular income and wealth inequality. He is the author of the best-selling book Capital in the Twenty-First Century (2013), which emphasises the themes of his work on wealth concentrations and distribution over the past 250 years. The book argues that the rate of capital return in developed countries is persistently greater than the rate of economic growth, and that this will cause wealth inequality to increase in the future. Piketty proposes improving the education systems and considers diffusion of knowledge, diffusion of skills, diffusion of idea of productivity as the main mechanism that will lead to lower inequality. In 2019, his book Capital and Ideology was published, which focuses on income inequality in various societies in history. His 2022 A Brief History of Equality is a much shorter book about wealth redistribution intended for a target audience of citizens instead of economists.

== Early life and education ==
Piketty was born in the Parisian suburb of Clichy, Hauts-de-Seine. His parents had been involved with a Trotskyist group and the May 1968 protests in Paris but they had moved away from this political position before Piketty was born. A visit to the Soviet Union in 1991 was enough to make him a firm "believe[r] in capitalism, private property and the market".

Piketty earned a C-stream (scientific) Baccalauréat, and after taking scientific preparatory classes, he entered the École Normale Supérieure (ENS) at the age of 18 where he studied mathematics and economics. At the age of 22, Piketty was awarded his PhD for a thesis on wealth redistribution, which he wrote at the LSE and EHESS under Roger Guesnerie and winning the French Economics Association's award for the best thesis of the year. He also met Daron Acemoglu for the first time at the LSE, who was also a PhD student at the time.

== Career ==
After earning his PhD, Piketty taught from 1993 to 1995 as an assistant professor in the department of economics at the Massachusetts Institute of Technology. In 1995, he joined the French National Centre for Scientific Research (CNRS) as a researcher, and in 2000 he became a professor (directeur d'études) at EHESS.

Piketty won the 2002 prize for the best young economist in France and, according to a list dated 11 November 2003, he is a member of the scientific orientation board of the association À gauche, en Europe, founded by Michel Rocard and Dominique Strauss-Kahn.

In 2006, Piketty became the first head of the PSE, which he helped organize. He left after a few months to serve as an economic advisor to Socialist Party candidate Ségolène Royal during the 2007 French presidential election. Piketty resumed teaching at the EHESS and PSE in 2007.

He is a columnist for French left-leaning newspaper Libération and regularly writes op-eds for center-left-leaning newspaper Le Monde.

In April 2012, Piketty co-authored along with 42 colleagues an open letter in support of then socialist party candidate for the French presidency François Hollande. Hollande won the contest against the incumbent Nicolas Sarkozy in May of that year. Piketty was unimpressed by Hollande's tenure, later describing him as "hopeless".

In 2013, Piketty won the biennial Yrjö Jahnsson Award, for the economist under age 45 who has "made a contribution in theoretical and applied research that is significant to the study of economics in Europe."

In January 2015, he rejected the French Legion of Honour order, stating that he refused the nomination because he did not think it was the government's role to decide who is honourable.

On 27 September 2015, it was announced that he had been appointed to the British Labour Party's Economic Advisory Committee, convened by Shadow Chancellor John McDonnell and reporting to Labour Party Leader Jeremy Corbyn. The appointment of Piketty, who had previously advised Lord Wood, key policy advisor to former Labour Party Leader Ed Miliband, that tax rates could be raised above 50% for earnings over one million pounds without it impacting the economy, was seen as a particular coup for the Labour Party leadership due to his breakthrough success in the mainstream publishing world. Regarding this appointment he stated that he was very happy to take part and assist the Labour Party in constructing an economic policy that helps tackle some of the biggest issues facing people in the UK and that there was a brilliant opportunity for the Labour party to construct a fresh and new political economy which will expose austerity for the failure it has been in the UK and Europe, although he was reportedly absent from the first meeting. In June 2016, he resigned from his role in Labour's Economic Advisory Committee, citing concerns over the weak campaign the party had run in the EU referendum.

On 2 October 2015, Piketty received an honorary doctorate from the University of Johannesburg and on 3 October 2015 he delivered the 13th Annual Nelson Mandela Lecture at the University of Johannesburg.

In 2015, Piketty was also elected an international member of the American Philosophical Society. Piketty joined the LSE in 2015 as the distinguished Centennial Professor. Piketty continues his research as part of the LSE International Inequalities Institute. His economic research focusses mainly on wealth inequalities and the use of capital in the 21st century. Piketty has long-standing ties to the LSE and he completed his PhD studies at the university in the early 1990s.

On 11 February 2017, it was announced that he had joined the Parti Socialiste's campaign team as an advisor to Benoît Hamon in his presidential run. He took in charge of EU matters, and more precisely, the Fiscal Stability Treaty (or TSCG), while Julia Cagé was responsible for the candidate's economic and fiscal platform. Piketty expressed his view that the TSCG should be renegotiated in order to introduce a eurozone assembly, composed of members of EU's parliaments – a "democratic government", he said, in comparison with the current system which he views as a "huis clos" (a "private, closed-door discussion", an in camera arrangement). Such change would currently require unanimous approval of all EU members, and Piketty has suggested that a change of rules might be necessary, saying that if countries representing 80% of EU's population or GDP ratify a treaty, it should be approved. He is also in favour of a "credible and bold basic income", which is one of Benoît Hamon's key proposals, although their views on the matter are different. The call in which Piketty and other economic researchers argue for their version of the basic income has been criticised as not "universal", a criticism he answered on his blog.

In addition to his research, Piketty also teaches post-graduate students at the LSE. His teaching and research approach is inter-disciplinary, and he has been involved in the teaching of the new MSc degree in Inequalities and Social Science at the LSE.

== Research ==
Piketty specializes in economic inequality, taking a historic and statistical approach. His work looks at the rate of capital accumulation in relation to economic growth over a two hundred year spread from the nineteenth century to the present. His novel use of tax records enabled him to gather data on the very top economic elite, who had previously been understudied, and to ascertain their rate of accumulation of wealth and how this compared to the rest of society and economy. His 2013 book Capital in the Twenty-First Century, relies on economic data going back 250 years to show that an ever-rising concentration of wealth is not self-correcting. To address this problem, he proposes redistribution through a progressive global tax on wealth.

=== Study of long-term economic inequalities ===
Thomas Piketty: Extreme inequality is useless for growth.

A research project on high incomes in France led to the book Les hauts revenus en France au XXe siècle (High incomes in France in the 20th Century, Grasset, 2001), which was based on a survey of statistical series covering the whole of the 20th century, built from data from the fiscal services (particularly income tax declarations). He extended this analysis in his immensely popular book Le Capital au XXIe siècle (Capital in the Twenty-First Century). A study by Emmanuel Saez and Piketty showed that the top 10 percent of earners took more than half of the country's total income in 2012, the highest level recorded since the government began collecting the relevant data a century ago.

=== Survey on the evolution of inequalities in France ===
Piketty's work shows that differences in earnings dropped sharply during the 20th century in France, mostly after World War II. He argues that this was due to a decrease in estate inequalities, while wage inequalities remained stable. The shrinking inequality during this period, Piketty says, resulted from a highly progressive income tax after the war, which upset the dynamics of estate accumulation by reducing the surplus money available for saving by the wealthiest.

The normative conclusion Piketty draws is that a tax cut and thus a decrease in the financial contribution to society of the wealthy that has been happening in France since the late 1990s will assist in the rebuilding of the earlier large fortunes of the rentier class. This trend will lead to the rise of what he calls patrimonial capitalism, in which a few families control most of the wealth.

Through a statistical survey, Piketty also showed that the Laffer effect, which claims that high marginal tax rates on top incomes are an incentive for the rich to work less, was probably negligible in the case of France.

=== Comparative work ===
Piketty has done comparative work on inequality in other developed countries. In collaboration with other economists, particularly Emmanuel Saez, he built a statistical series based on a similar method used in his studies of France. This research led to reports on the evolution of inequalities in the US, and on economic dynamics in the English-speaking world and continental Europe. Saez won the prestigious John Bates Clark prize for this work.

The surveys found that following the Second World War, after initially undergoing a decrease in economic inequality similar to that in continental Europe, English-speaking countries have, over the past thirty years, experienced increasing inequalities.

=== Critique of the Kuznets curve ===
Piketty's work has been discussed as a critical continuation of the pioneering work of Simon Kuznets in the 1950s. According to Kuznets, the long-term evolution of earnings inequalities was shaped as a curve (Kuznets curve). Growth started at the beginning of the industrial revolution and slackened off later due to the reallocation of the labor force from low productivity sectors like agriculture to higher productivity sectors like industry.

According to Piketty, the tendency observed by Kuznets in the early 1950s is not necessarily a product of deep economic forces (e.g. sectoral spillover or the effects of technological progress). Instead, estate values, rather than wage inequalities, decreased, and they did so for reasons that were not specifically economic (for example, the creation of income tax). Consequently, the decrease would not necessarily continue, and in fact, inequalities have grown sharply in the United States over the last thirty years, returning to their 1930s level.

=== Other work ===
Besides these surveys, which make up the core of his work, Piketty has published in other areas, often with a connection to economic inequalities. His work on schools, for example, postulates that disparities among different schools, especially class sizes, are a cause for the persistence of inequalities in wages and the economy. He has also published proposals for changes in the French pension system and the French tax system. In a 2018 paper, Piketty suggested that throughout the Western world, political parties of both the left and the right have been captured by the "elites," coining the terms Brahmin Left and Merchant Right respectively to describe them. According to Piketty, western left-wing parties have lost working-class voters and are now dominated by highly educated voters.

=== Capital in the Twenty-First Century ===
Capital in the Twenty-First Century, published in 2013, focuses on wealth and income inequality in Europe and the US since the 18th century. The book's central thesis is that inequality is not an accident but rather a feature of capitalism that can be reversed only through state intervention. The book thus argues that unless capitalism is reformed, the very democratic order will be threatened. The book reached number one on The New York Times bestselling hardcover nonfiction list from 18 May 2014. Piketty offered a "possible remedy: a global tax on wealth".

In 2014, he was awarded the British Academy Medal for this book.

=== Capital and Ideology ===
Capital and Ideology, a book published in 2019, is a successor to Capital in the Twenty-First Century in its themes of inequality of income and wealth. It argues it is necessary to examine the ideological systems which attempted to justify the forms of inequality specific to different institutional configurations, and how these have had an impact, through fiscal and economic policy, on the distribution of wealth and income. Piketty argues that various ideologies arise to defend inequality, and wealth is diverted to sustain these ideologies; however a higher standard of living did not come from the sacralization of property ownership but from social protests. The book contains significant material dedicated to prescriptions for reducing inequality of wealth and income, such as a wealth tax, and to sustaining ideological support for such fiscal and economic policies. This work was well received, but some critics considered Piketty's work too vague. In particular, Nicolas Brisset criticized his definitions and analyses of "ideology" and "capitalism" for being too weak. Cleveland Review of Books praised the book, saying it "utilizes historical, political, and philosophical analysis to provide a sweeping and detailed account of the ideological context behind how what he calls "inequality regimes" sustain themselves."

=== A Brief History of Equality ===
His 2022 A Brief History of Equality is a much shorter book about wealth redistribution intended for a target audience of citizens not economists, in which he traced a history of equality from 1780 to 2020. In August 2022, Piketty was interviewed about the book for New Books Network.

== Personal life ==
Piketty was the partner of the politician Aurélie Filippetti. In 2009, she filed a complaint of domestic violence to the police against Piketty; she later withdrew her complaint after he acknowledged facts of domestic violence. Additionally, he was later found guilty of libel against her in 2022.

He is married to fellow economist Julia Cagé.

== Personal views ==
In November 2023, Piketty called for a ban on private jets to fight against climate change and called for a progressive carbon tax in response to a report highlighting the disproportionate amounts of carbon emissions by the richest 1% of people.

== Selected works and publications ==
=== In French ===
- Les hauts revenus face aux modifications des taux marginaux supérieurs de l'impôt sur le revenu en France, 1970–1996 (Document de Travail du CEPREMAP, n° 9812, July 1998)
- Inégalités économiques: report to the Counsel of Economic Analysis (14 June 2001) with Tony Atkinson, Michel Godet and Lucile Olier
- Les hauts revenus en France au XXème siècle, Inégalités et redistribution, 1901–1998 (ed. Grasset, September 2001)
- Fiscalité et redistribution sociale dans la France du XXe siècle (October 2001)
- L'économie des inégalités (ed. La Découverte, April 2004)
- Vive la gauche américaine ! : Chroniques 1998–2004 (Éditions de l'Aube, September 2004)
- Pour un nouveau système de retraite : Des comptes individuels de cotisations financés par répartition (Éditions Rue d'Ulm/CEPREMAP, 2008) with Antoine Bozio
- On the Long run evolution of inheritance. France, 1820–2050 (PSE Working Paper, 2010)
- Pour une révolution fiscale (ed. Le Seuil, 2011) with Emmanuel Saez and Camille Landais
- Peut-on sauver l'Europe ? Chroniques 2004–2012 (Les Liens qui Libèrent, 2012)
- Le Capital au XXIe siècle (Seuil, 2013)
- Capital et idéologie (Seuil, 2019)
- Une brève histoire de l'égalité, Paris: Ed. du Seuil, 2021, 350p.
- Vers le socialisme écologique: Chroniques 2020-2024 (Seuil, 2024)

=== In English ===
- Atkinson, Anthony Barnes; Piketty, Thomas, eds. (2007). Top Incomes over the Twentieth Century: A Contrast between European and English-Speaking Countries. Oxford: Oxford University Press. ISBN 978-0199286881. OCLC 883868966.
- Atkinson, Anthony Barnes; Piketty, Thomas, eds. (2010). Top Incomes: A Global Perspective. Oxford: Oxford University Press. ISBN 978-0199286898. OCLC 444383200.
- Capital in the Twenty-First Century (Cambridge, MA: Belknap Press, 2014)
- About Capital in the Twenty-First Century (AER, 2015)
- Carbon and Inequality: From Kyoto to Paris: Trends in the global inequality of carbon emissions (1998-2013) & prospects for an equitable adaptation fund (Lucas Chancel, T. Piketty, Paris School of Economics, 2015)
- Chronicles: On Our Troubled Times (Viking, 2016)
- Why Save the Bankers? And Other Essays on Our Economic and Political Crisis (Houghton Mifflin Harcourt, 2016)
- Top Incomes in France in the Twentieth Century: Inequality and Redistribution, 1901–1998 (Harvard University Press, 2018)
- Capital and Ideology (Harvard University Press, 2020)
- Time for Socialism: Dispatches from a World on Fire, 2016-2021 (Yale University Press, 2021)
- "The western elite is preventing us from going after the assets of Russia's hyper-rich" (The Guardian, 16 March 2022).
- A Brief History of Equality, Harvard University Press, 2022, 274p. Data,
- Equality Is a Struggle: Bulletins from the Front Line, 2021-2025, Yale University Press, 2025

== See also ==
- Capital accumulation
- Criticism of capitalism
