= Balthasar H. Meyer =

American government official and professor

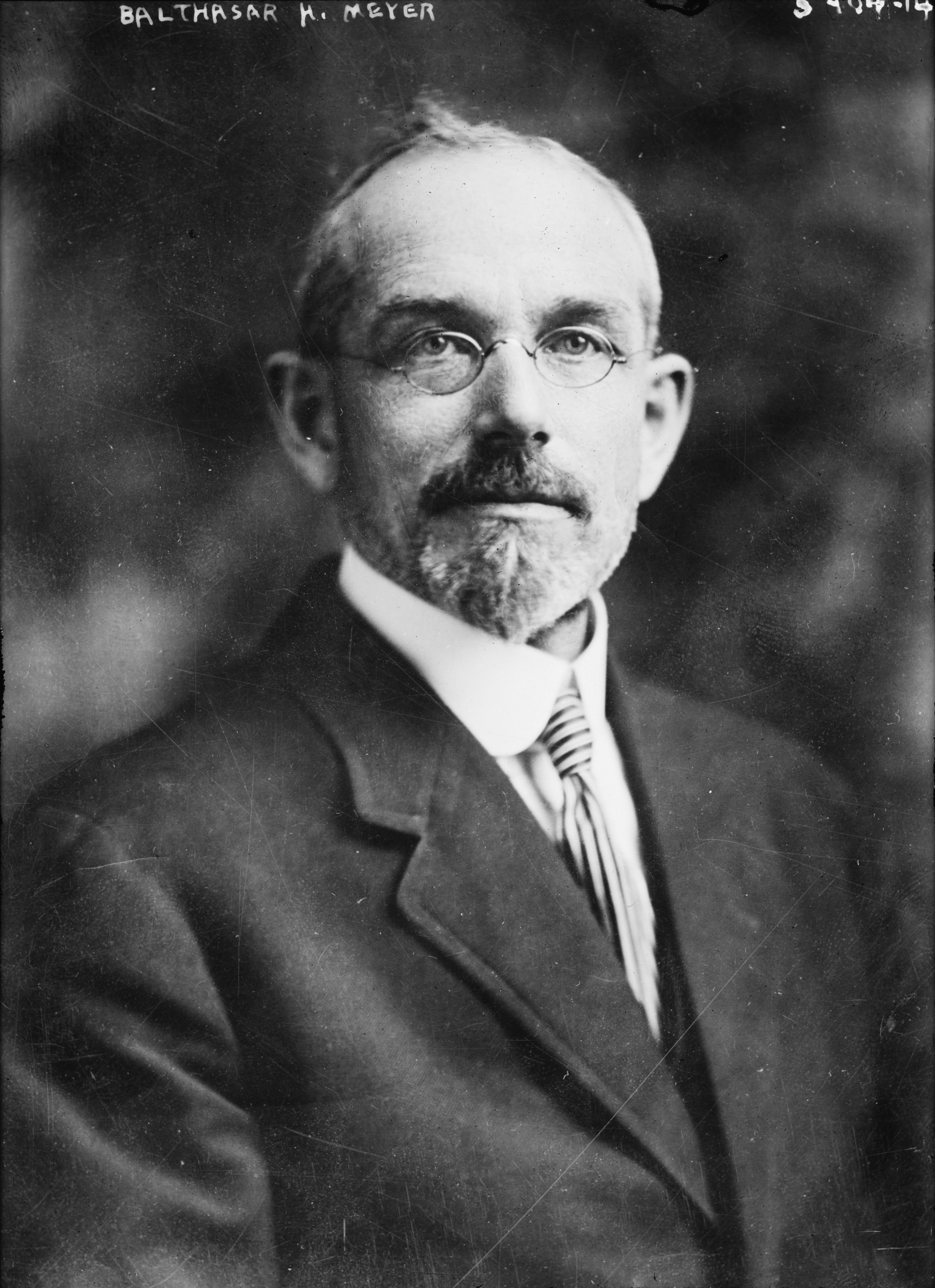
- Balthasar H. Meyer
- Born: May 28, 1866; Mequon, Wisconsin, US
- Died: February 9, 1954 (aged 87); Washington, D.C.

Academic background
- Education: University of Wisconsin–Madison; Oshkosh State Normal School

Academic work
- Doctoral students: Max O. Lorenz

Balthasar Henry Meyer (May 28, 1866 – February 9, 1954) was an American government official and professor of economics and sociology. He served for 28 years as a member of the Interstate Commerce Commission.

== Early life ==
Meyer was born near Mequon, Wisconsin, the son of Henry and Louise (Wiepking) Meyer. He attended Oshkosh State Normal School, receiving his bachelor's degree, and then took two degrees, including his doctorate in 1897, from the University of Wisconsin, after doing graduate work at the University of Berlin in 1894–95.

He taught school from 1884 to 1886. He was principal of the Fredonia, Wisconsin, schools from 1887 to 1889. He was principal of the high school at Port Washington, Wisconsin, from 1889 to 1892. After receiving his degrees, he stayed on in Madison to be a sociology instructor. He was promoted to assistant professor in 1899, and to full professor of political economy in 1900. While there, he taught what is believed to be the first course in insurance in the United States. He married Alice Elizabeth Carlton of Wauwatosa, Wisconsin, on August 29, 1901.

== Government official ==
In 1905, he took leave from his professorship to become a member of the Wisconsin Railroad Commission, and then, in 1907, became its chairman. In 1910, President William Howard Taft appointed him to the U.S. Railroad Security Commission. In 1910, Taft appointed him to the Interstate Commerce Commission. Confirmed by the Senate on December 21, 1910, he took the oath of office on December 31, 1910. Meyer was thereafter appointed to successive terms by Presidents Wilson, Coolidge, Hoover, and Franklin Roosevelt. Following his 1939 retirement, he served as a consultant and mediator for the transportation industry.

Meyer also gave attention to improving the ICC's internal capabilities. Meyer and his ally, fellow Commissioner Franklin K. Lane, supported increasing the Commission's ability to compute marginal rates, and the Commission engaged noted economist Max O. Lorenz (inventor of the Lorenz curve) for this task.

In 1937, Meyer was attacked by Senator Harry S. Truman for allegedly giving a railroad attorney information about a 1932 Commission decision before it was publicly released. Meyer explained that while he had no recollection of the specific case, it was routine in uncontested cases such as this to give information to the applicant without waiting for a formal decision.

While Meyer's fourth and final term expired in 1938, he continued to serve until the following year pending Senate confirmation of a replacement. President Franklin D. Roosevelt appointed Representative Thomas R. Amlie. The Amlie nomination proved contentious and was withdrawn, and Meyer, wishing to retire, resigned on May 1, 1939.

Meyers wrote several books about the transportation industry, including Railroad Legislation in the United States (1903) and History of Transportation in the United States before 1860 (1917).

He was a member of the American Economic Association, the American Academy of Political and Social Science, the Wisconsin Academy of Letters Arts and Sciences, the Wisconsin Educational Round Table, the Wisconsin Teachers' Association, the Press Club of the University of Wisconsin, and the Wisconsin Historical Society.

== Writings and publications ==
- Balthasar Henry Meyer (1906). "A History of the Northern Securities Case". Bulletin of the University of Wisconsin (142). Madison: University of Wisconsin.
