= Gibrat's law =

Economic principle

Gibrat's law, sometimes called Gibrat's rule of proportionate growth or the law of proportionate effect, is a rule defined by Robert Gibrat (1904–1980) in 1931 stating that the proportional rate of growth of a firm is independent of its absolute size. The law of proportionate growth gives rise to a firm size distribution that is log-normal.

== Characteristics ==
In general, processes characterized by Gibrat's law converge to a limiting distribution, often proposed to be the log-normal, or a power law, depending on more specific assumptions about the stochastic growth process. However, the tail of the lognormal may fall off too quickly, and its PDF is not monotonic, but rather has a Y-intercept of zero probability at the origin. The typical power law is the Pareto I, which has a tail that cannot model fall-off in the tail at large outcomes size, and which does not extend downwards to zero, but rather must be truncated at some positive minimum value. More recently, the Weibull distribution has been derived as the limiting distribution for Gibrat processes, by recognizing that (a) the increments of the growth process are not independent, but rather correlated, in magnitude, and (b) the increment magnitudes typically have monotonic PDFs. The Weibull PDF can appear essentially log-log linear over orders of magnitude ranging from zero, while eventually falling off at unreasonably large outcome sizes.

== Applications ==
=== Cities ===
Gibrat's law is also applied to cities' size and growth rate, where proportionate growth process may give rise to a distribution of city sizes that is log-normal, as predicted by Gibrat's law. While the city size distribution is often associated with Zipf's law, this holds only in the upper tail. When considering the entire size distribution, not just the largest cities, then the city size distribution is log-normal. The log-normality of the distribution reconciles Gibrat's law also for cities: The law of proportionate effect will therefore imply that the logarithms of the variable will be distributed following the log-normal distribution. In isolation, the upper tail (less than 1,000 out of 24,000 cities) fits both the log-normal and the Pareto distribution: the uniformly most powerful unbiased test comparing the lognormal to the power law shows that the largest 1000 cities are distinctly in the power law regime.

However, it has been argued that it is problematic to define cities through their fairly arbitrary legal boundaries (the places method treats Cambridge and Boston, Massachusetts as two separate units). A clustering method to construct cities from the bottom up by clustering populated areas obtained from high-resolution data finds a power-law distribution of city size consistent with Zipf's law in almost the entire range of sizes. Note that populated areas are still aggregated rather than individual based. A new method based on individual street nodes for the clustering process leads to the concept of natural cities. It has been found that natural cities exhibit a striking Zipf's law Furthermore, the clustering method allows for a direct assessment of Gibrat's law. It is found that the growth of agglomerations is not consistent with Gibrat's law: the mean and standard deviation of the growth rates of cities follows a power-law with the city size.

=== Firms ===
In the study of the firms (business), the scholars do not agree that the foundation and the outcome of Gibrat's law are empirically correct.

== See also ==
- List of eponymous laws
