= Lorenz asymmetry coefficient =

Summary statistic of the Lorenz curve

The Lorenz asymmetry coefficient (LAC) is a summary statistic of the Lorenz curve that measures the degree of asymmetry of the curve. The Lorenz curve is used to describe the inequality in the distribution of a quantity (usually income or wealth in economics, or size or reproductive output in ecology). The most common summary statistic for the Lorenz curve is the Gini coefficient, which is an overall measure of inequality within the population. The Lorenz asymmetry coefficient can be a useful supplement to the Gini coefficient. The Lorenz asymmetry coefficient is defined as

$$S = F(\mu)+ L(\mu)$$

where the functions F and L are defined as for the Lorenz curve, and μ is the mean. If S > 1, then the point where the Lorenz curve is parallel with the line of equality is above the axis of symmetry. Correspondingly, if S < 1, then the point where the Lorenz curve is parallel to the line of equality is below the axis of symmetry.

If data arise from the log-normal distribution, then S = 1, i.e., the Lorenz curve is symmetric.

The sample statistic S can be calculated from n ordered size data, $(x_1, ..., x_m,x_{m+1},..., x_n)$, using the following equations:

$$\delta=\frac{\mu - x_m}{x_{m+1} - x_m}$$

$$F(\mu)=\frac{m + \delta}{n}$$

$$L(\mu)=\frac{L_m + \delta  x_{m+1}}{L_n}$$,

where m is the number of individuals with a size or wealth less than μ and $L_i=\sum_{j=1}^i x_j$. However, if one or more of the data size is equal to μ, then S has to defined as an interval instead of a number (see #LAC interval when some data is equal to μ).

The Lorenz asymmetry coefficient characterizes an important aspect of the shape of a Lorenz curve. It tells which size or wealth classes contribute most to the population’s total inequality, as measured by the Gini coefficient. If the LAC is less than 1, the inequality is primarily due to the relatively many small or poor individuals. If the LAC is greater than 1, the inequality is primarily due to the few largest or wealthiest individuals.

For incomes distributed according to a log-normal distribution, the LAC is identically 1.

== LAC interval when some data is equal to μ ==
The above formulas assume that none of the data values are equal to μ; strictly speaking we assume that data sizes are continuously distributed, so that $P(x_i = \mu) \approx 0$. Otherwise, if one or more of $x_i = \mu$, then a section of the Lorenz curve is parallel to the diagonal, and S has to be defined as an interval instead of a number. The interval can be defined as follows:

$\left [ \frac{m}{n} + \frac{L_m}{L_n}, \frac{m+a}{n} + \frac{L_{m+a}}{L_n} \right ]$

where a is the number of data values that are equal to μ.
