= Modified lognormal power-law distribution =

The modified lognormal power-law (MLP) function is a three parameter function that can be used to model data that have characteristics of a log-normal distribution and a power law behavior. It has been used to model the functional form of the initial mass function (IMF). Unlike the other functional forms of the IMF, the MLP is a single function with no joining conditions.

== Functional form ==
The closed form of the probability density function of the MLP is as follows:

$$\begin{align}
f(m)= \frac{\alpha}{2} \exp\left(\alpha \mu _0+ \frac{\alpha ^2 \sigma _0 ^2}{2}\right) m^{-(1+\alpha)} \text{erfc}\left( \frac{1}{\sqrt{2}}\left(\alpha \sigma _0 -\frac{\ln(m)- \mu _0 }{\sigma_0}\right)\right),\ m \in [0,\infty)
\end{align}$$

where
$$\begin{align} \alpha = \frac{\delta}{\gamma} \end{align}$$
is the asymptotic power-law index of the distribution. Here $\mu_0$ and $\sigma_0^2$ are the mean and variance, respectively, of an underlying lognormal distribution from which the MLP is derived.

== Mathematical properties ==
Following are the few mathematical properties of the MLP distribution:

=== Cumulative distribution ===
The MLP cumulative distribution function ($F(m) = \int_{-\infty}^m f(t) \,dt$) is given by:

$$\begin{align}
F(m) = \frac{1}{2} \text{erfc}\left(-\frac{\ln(m)-\mu_0}{\sqrt{2}\sigma_0}\right) - \frac{1}{2} \exp\left(\alpha \mu _0 + \frac{\alpha ^2 \sigma ^2 _0}{2}\right) m^{-\alpha} \text{erfc}\left(\frac{\alpha \sigma _0}{\sqrt{2}}\left(\alpha \sigma _0 - \frac{\ln(m)- \mu_0}{\sqrt{2}\sigma_0}\right)\right)
\end{align}$$

We can see that as $m\to 0,$ that $\textstyle F(m)\to \frac{1}{2} \operatorname{erfc}\left(-\frac{\ln(m - \mu_0)}{\sqrt{2}\sigma_0}\right),$ which is the cumulative distribution function for a lognormal distribution with parameters μ_{0} and σ_{0}.

=== Mean, variance, raw moments ===
The expectation value of $M$^{k} gives the $k$^{th} raw moment of $M$,

$$\begin{align}
\langle M^k\rangle = \int _0 ^{\infty} m^k f(m) \mathrm dm
\end{align}$$

This exists if and only if α > $k$, in which case it becomes:

$$\begin{align}
\langle M^k\rangle = \frac{\alpha}{\alpha-k} \exp\left(\frac{\sigma_0 ^2 k^2}{2} + \mu_0 k\right),\ \alpha > k
\end{align}$$

which is the $k$^{th} raw moment of the lognormal distribution with the parameters μ_{0} and σ_{0} scaled by α/(α-$k$) in the limit α→∞. This gives the mean and variance of the MLP distribution:

$$\begin{align}
\langle M \rangle = \frac{\alpha}{\alpha-1} \exp\left(\frac{\sigma ^2 _0}{2} + \mu _0\right),\  \alpha > 1
\end{align}$$

$$\begin{align}
\langle M^2 \rangle = \frac{\alpha}{\alpha-2} \exp\left(2\left(\sigma ^2 _0 + \mu _0\right)\right),\  \alpha > 2
\end{align}$$

Var($M$) = ⟨$M$^{2}⟩-(⟨$M$⟩)^{2} = α exp(σ_{0}^{2} + 2μ_{0}) (exp(σ_{0}^{2})/(α-2) - α/((α-2)^{2})), α > 2

=== Mode ===
The solution to the equation $f'(m)$ = 0 (equating the slope to zero at the point of maxima) for $m$ gives the mode of the MLP distribution.

$$f'(m) = 0  \Leftrightarrow K \operatorname{erfc}(u) = \exp(-u^2),$$

where $\textstyle u = \frac{1}{\sqrt{2}} \left( \alpha\sigma_0 - \frac{\ln m - \mu_0}{\sigma_0} \right)$ and $K = \sigma_0(\alpha+1)\tfrac{\sqrt{\pi}}{2}.$

Numerical methods are required to solve this transcendental equation. However, noting that if $K$≈1 then u = 0 gives us the mode $m$^{*}:

$$m^* = \exp (\mu_0+ \alpha \sigma ^2 _0)$$

=== Random variate ===
The lognormal random variate is:

$$\begin{align}
L(\mu,\sigma) = \exp(\mu+\sigma N(0,1))
\end{align}$$

where $N(0,1)$ is standard normal random variate. The exponential random variate is :

$$\begin{align}
E(\delta) = - \delta^{-1} \ln(R(0,1))
\end{align}$$

where R(0,1) is the uniform random variate in the interval [0,1]. Using these two, we can derive the random variate for the MLP distribution to be:

$$\begin{align}
M (\mu_0,\sigma_0,\alpha) =  \exp(\mu_0 + \sigma_0 N (0,1) - \alpha^{-1} \ln(R(0,1)))
\end{align}$$
