= Max O. Lorenz =

American economist

- Born: Max Otto Lorenz; September 19, 1876; Burlington, Iowa, U.S.
- Died: July 1, 1959 (aged 82); Sunnyvale, California, U.S.

Academic background
- Education: University of Wisconsin–Madison; University of Iowa
- Doctoral advisor: Balthasar H. Meyer

Academic work
- Notable ideas: Lorenz curve

Max Otto Lorenz (/ˈlɒrənts/ LORR-ənts; September 19, 1876 – July 1, 1959) was an American economist who developed the Lorenz curve in an undergraduate essay. He published a paper on this when he was a doctoral student at the University of Wisconsin–Madison. His doctoral thesis (1906) was on 'The Economic Theory of Railroad Rates' and made no reference to perhaps his most famous paper. The term "Lorenz curve" for the measure Lorenz invented was coined by Willford I. King in 1912.

He was of German ancestry, his father having been born in Essen in the Rhine Province of the Kingdom of Prussia in 1841.

He was active in both publishing and teaching and was at various times employed by the U.S. Census Bureau, the U.S. Bureau of Railway Economics, the U.S. Bureau of Statistics and the U.S. Interstate Commerce Commission. In 1917 he was elected as a Fellow of the American Statistical Association.

He was married to Nellie, and fathered three sons.
