= Geometric standard deviation =

Statistical measure

In probability theory and statistics, the geometric standard deviation (GSD) describes how spread out are a set of numbers whose preferred average is the geometric mean. For such data, it may be preferred to the more usual standard deviation. Note that unlike the usual arithmetic standard deviation, the geometric standard deviation is a multiplicative factor, and thus is dimensionless, rather than having the same dimension as the input values. Thus, the geometric standard deviation may be more appropriately called geometric SD factor. When using geometric SD factor in conjunction with geometric mean, it should be described as "the range from (the geometric mean divided by the geometric SD factor) to (the geometric mean multiplied by the geometric SD factor), and one cannot add/subtract "geometric SD factor" to/from geometric mean.

== Definition ==
If the geometric mean of a set of numbers ${A_1, A_2, ..., A_n}$ is denoted as $\mu_\mathrm{g}$, then the geometric standard deviation is

$$\sigma_\mathrm{g} = \exp \sqrt{ {1\over n}\sum_{i=1}^n \left( \ln {A_i \over \mu_\mathrm{g}} \right)^2 }\,.$$

== Derivation ==
If the geometric mean is

$$\mu_\mathrm{g} = \sqrt[n]{A_1 A_2 \cdots A_n}$$

then taking the natural logarithm of both sides results in

$$\ln \mu_\mathrm{g} = {1 \over n} \ln (A_1 A_2 \cdots A_n).$$

The logarithm of a product is a sum of logarithms (assuming $A_i$ is positive for all $i$), so

$$\ln \mu_\mathrm{g} = {1 \over n} \left[ \ln A_1 + \ln A_2 + \cdots + \ln A_n \right].$$

It can now be seen that $\ln \mu_\mathrm{g}$ is the arithmetic mean of the set $\{ \ln A_1, \ln A_2, \dots , \ln A_n \}$, therefore the arithmetic standard deviation of this same set should be

$$\ln \sigma_\mathrm{g} = \sqrt{ {1\over n} \sum_{i=1}^n (\ln A_i - \ln \mu_\mathrm{g})^2 }\,.$$

This simplifies to

$$\sigma_\mathrm{g} = \exp \sqrt{ {1\over n}\sum_{i=1}^n \left( \ln {A_i \over \mu_\mathrm{g}} \right)^2 }\,.$$

== Geometric standard score ==
The geometric version of the standard score is

$$z = {{\ln x - \ln \mu_\mathrm{g}} \over \ln \sigma_\mathrm{g}} = \log _{\sigma_\mathrm{g}} \left({x \over \mu_\mathrm{g}}\right).$$

If the geometric mean, standard deviation, and z-score of a datum are known, then the raw score can be reconstructed by

$$x = \mu_\mathrm{g} {\sigma_\mathrm{g}}^z.$$

== Relationship to log-normal distribution ==
The geometric standard deviation is used as a measure of log-normal dispersion analogously to the geometric mean. As the log-transform of a log-normal distribution results in a normal distribution, we see that the geometric standard deviation is the exponentiated value of the standard deviation of the log-transformed values, i.e. $\sigma_\mathrm{g} = \exp(\operatorname{stdev}(\ln A))$.

As such, the geometric mean and the geometric standard deviation of a sample of data from a log-normally distributed population may be used to find the bounds of confidence intervals analogously to the way the arithmetic mean and standard deviation are used to bound confidence intervals for a normal distribution. See discussion in log-normal distribution for details.
