= Univariate distribution =

Probability distribution of only one random variable

In statistics, a univariate distribution is a probability distribution of only one random variable. This is in contrast to a multivariate distribution, the probability distribution of a random vector (consisting of multiple random variables). Univariate distributions can be characterized by their probability mass function for discrete variables, probability density function for continuous variables, or their cumulative distribution function, which applies to all types of random variables.

== Characterization ==
A univariate distribution can be described by different functions depending on whether the random variable is discrete or continuous.

- The probability mass function gives the probability that a discrete random variable is equal to a specific value.
- For a continuous random variable, the probability density function represents the density of probability. Its integral over a range gives the probability that the variable will fall within that range.
- The cumulative distribution function is defined for any kind of random variable (discrete, continuous, and mixed) and gives the probability that the variable X will take a value less than or equal to x.

== Examples ==
Continuous uniform distribution

One of the simplest examples of a discrete univariate distribution is the discrete uniform distribution, where all elements of a finite set are equally likely. It is the probability model for the outcomes of tossing a fair coin, rolling a fair die, etc. The univariate continuous uniform distribution on an interval [a, b] has the property that all sub-intervals of the same length are equally likely.

Binomial distribution with normal approximation for n = 6 and p = 0.5

Other examples of discrete univariate distributions include the binomial, geometric, negative binomial, and Poisson distributions. At least 750 univariate discrete distributions have been reported in the literature.

Examples of commonly applied continuous univariate distributions include the normal distribution, Student's t distribution, chisquare distribution, F distribution, exponential and gamma distributions.

== See also ==
- Univariate
- Bivariate distribution
- List of probability distributions
