= Lorenz curve =

Graph of wealth or income distribution

A typical Lorenz curve

In economics, the Lorenz curve is a graphical representation of the distribution of income or of wealth. It was developed by Max O. Lorenz in 1905 for representing inequality of the wealth distribution.

The curve is a graph showing the proportion of overall income or wealth assumed by the bottom x% of the people, although this is not rigorously true for a finite population (see below). It is often used to represent income distribution, where it shows for the bottom x% of households, what percentage (y%) of the total income they have. The percentage of households is plotted on the x-axis, the percentage of income on the y-axis. It can also be used to show distribution of assets. In such use, many economists consider it to be a measure of social inequality.

The concept is useful in describing inequality among the size of individuals in ecology and in studies of biodiversity, where the cumulative proportion of species is plotted against the cumulative proportion of individuals. It is also useful in business modeling: e.g., in consumer finance, to measure the actual percentage y% of delinquencies attributable to the x% of people with worst risk scores. Lorenz curves were also applied to epidemiology and public health, e.g., to measure pandemic inequality as the distribution of national cumulative incidence (y%) generated by the population residing in areas (x%) ranked with respect to their local epidemic attack rate.

== Explanation ==
Derivation of the Lorenz curve and Gini coefficient for global income in 2011

Points on the Lorenz curve represent statements such as, "the bottom 20% of all households have 10% of the total income."

A perfectly equal income distribution would be one in which every person has the same income. In this case, the bottom N% of society would always have N% of the income. This can be depicted by the straight line y = x; called the "line of perfect equality."

By contrast, a perfectly unequal distribution would be one in which one person has all the income and everyone else has none. In that case, the curve would be at y = 0% for all x < 100%, and y = 100% when x = 100%. This curve is called the "line of perfect inequality."

The Gini coefficient is the ratio of the area between the line of perfect equality and the observed Lorenz curve to the area between the line of perfect equality and the line of perfect inequality. The higher the coefficient, the more unequal the distribution is. In the diagram on the right, this is given by the ratio A / (A+B), where A and B are the areas of regions as marked in the diagram.

== Definition and calculation ==
Lorenz curve for US wealth distribution in 2016 showing negative wealth and oligarchy

The Lorenz curve is a probability plot (a P–P plot) comparing the distribution of a variable against a hypothetical uniform distribution of that variable. It can usually be represented by a function L(F), where F, the cumulative portion of the population, is represented by the horizontal axis, and L, the cumulative portion of the total wealth or income, is represented by the vertical axis.

The curve L need not be a smoothly increasing function of F, For wealth distributions there may be oligarchies or people with negative wealth for instance.

Table 1: Parametric unification of CDF, First Moment Distribution, and Lorenz Curve via $x$, $p(x)$, and $L(p(x))$.
Variable	Value Type / Units	Definition	Discrete Formula ($N$ subjects)	Continuous Formula	Axis Mapping
Wealth Threshold ($x$); Parametric Driver	Absolute Quantity; Currency / Dollars ($[0, \infty)$)	Dollar cutoff value $x$	$x$	$x = F^{-1}(p)$	CDF X-Axis (Input); 1st Moment X-Axis (Input)
Cumulative Population Share ($p(x)$); Standard CDF: $F(x)$	Proportion / % Unitless ratio ($[0, 1]$ or $0\text{--}100\%$)	Fraction of population earning $\le x$	$p(x) = \frac{\sum_{x_i \le x} 1}{N}$	$p(x) = F(x) = \int_0^x f(t)\,dt$	CDF Y-Axis (Output) ↓ Lorenz X-Axis (Input)
Cumulative Wealth Share ($L(p(x))$); 1st Moment Dist: $F_1(x)$	Proportion / % Unitless ratio ($[0, 1]$ or $0\text{--}100\%$)	Fraction of total wealth held by people earning $\le x$	$L(p(x)) = \frac{\sum_{x_i \le x} x_i}{\sum_{i=1}^{N} x_i}$	$L(p(x)) = F_1(x) = \frac{\int_0^x t\,f(t)\,dt}{\mu}$	1st Moment Y-Axis (Output) ↓ Lorenz Y-Axis (Output)

Table 2: The three 2D projections derived from the 3D space curve $\vec{r}(x) = (x, \, p(x), \, L(p(x)))$.
Projection Axes	Formal Curve Name	Question Answered	Role of $x$
$x$ vs. $p(x)$	Cumulative Distribution Function ($F(x)$)	What fraction of people earn below $x$?	Explicit (X-Axis)
$x$ vs. $L(p(x))$	First Moment Distribution Function ($F_1(x)$)	What fraction of total wealth is owned by people earning below $x$?	Explicit (X-Axis)
$p$ vs. $L(p)$	Lorenz Curve	What fraction of total wealth is owned by the bottom $p$ fraction of people?	Implicit (Parametric link)

For a discrete distribution of Y given by values y_{1}, ..., y_{n} in non-decreasing order (y_{i} ≤ y_{i+1}) and their probabilities $f(y_j) := \Pr(Y=y_j)$ the Lorenz curve is the continuous piecewise linear function connecting the points (F_{i}, L_{i}), i = 0 to n, where F_{0} = 0, L_{0} = 0, and for i = 1 to n:
$$\begin{align}
F_i &:= \sum_{j=1}^i f(y_j) \\
S_i &:= \sum_{j=1}^i  f(y_j) \, y_j \\
L_i &:= \frac{S_i}{S_n}
\end{align}$$

When all y_{i} are equally probable with probabilities 1 / n this simplifies to
$$\begin{align}
F_i &= \frac i n \\
S_i &= \frac 1 n \sum_{j=1}^i \; y_j \\
L_i &= \frac{S_i}{S_n}
\end{align}$$

For a continuous distribution with the probability density function f and the cumulative distribution function F, the Lorenz curve L is given by:
$$L(F(x)) = \frac{\int_{-\infty}^x t\,f(t)\,dt}{\int_{-\infty}^\infty t\,f(t)\,dt} = \frac{\int_{-\infty}^x t\,f(t)\,dt}{\mu}$$
where $\mu$ denotes the average. The Lorenz curve L(F) may then be plotted as a function parametric in x: L(x) vs. F(x). In other contexts, the quantity computed here is known as the length biased (or size biased) distribution; it also has an important role in renewal theory.

Alternatively, for a cumulative distribution function F(x) with its inverse, the quantile function x(F), the Lorenz curve L(F) is directly given by:
$$L(F) = \frac{\int_0^F x(F_1)\,dF_1}{\int_0^1 x(F_1)\,dF_1}$$

The quantile function x(F) may not exist because the cumulative distribution function has intervals of constant values. However, the previous formula can still apply by generalizing the definition of x(F):
$$x(F_1) = \inf \{y : F(y) \geq F_1\}$$
where inf is the infimum.

For an example of a Lorenz curve, see Pareto distribution.

== Properties ==
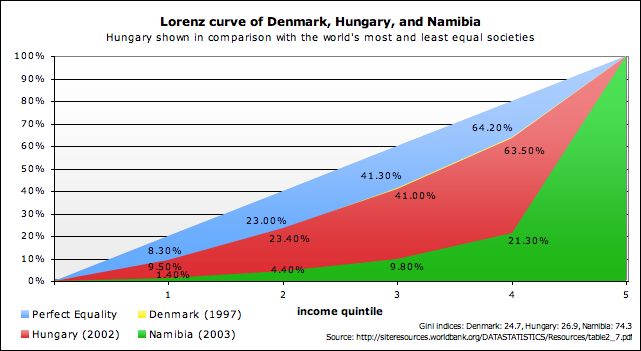
A practical example of a Lorenz curve: the Lorenz curves of Denmark, Hungary, and Namibia

A Lorenz curve always starts at (0,0) and ends at (1,1).

The Lorenz curve is not defined if the mean of the probability distribution is zero or infinite.

The Lorenz curve for a probability distribution is a continuous function. However, Lorenz curves representing discontinuous functions can be constructed as the limit of Lorenz curves of probability distributions, the line of perfect inequality being an example.

The information in a Lorenz curve may be summarized by the Gini coefficient and the Lorenz asymmetry coefficient.

The Lorenz curve cannot rise above the line of perfect equality.

A Lorenz curve that never falls beneath a second Lorenz curve and at least once runs above it, has Lorenz dominance over the second one.

If the variable being measured cannot take negative values, the Lorenz curve:

- cannot sink below the line of perfect inequality,
- is increasing.

Note however that a Lorenz curve for net worth would start out by going negative due to the fact that some people have a negative net worth because of debt.

The Lorenz curve is invariant under positive scaling. If X is a random variable, for any positive number c the random variable cX has the same Lorenz curve as X.

The Lorenz curve is flipped twice, once about F = 0.5 and once about L = 0.5, by negation. If X is a random variable with Lorenz curve L_{X}(F), then −X has the Lorenz curve:

L_{−X} = 1 − L_{X}(1 − F)

The Lorenz curve is changed by translations so that the equality gap F − L(F) changes in proportion to the ratio of the original and translated means. If X is a random variable with a Lorenz curve L_{X}(F) and mean μ_{X}, then for any constant c ≠ −μ_{X}, X + c has a Lorenz curve defined by:
$$F - L_{X+c}(F) = \frac{\mu_X}{\mu_X + c} ( F - L_X(F))$$

For a cumulative distribution function F(x) with mean μ and (generalized) quantile function x(F), then for any F with 0 < F < 1 :

- If the Lorenz curve is differentiable:
  $$\frac{d L(F)}{d F} = \frac{x(F)}{\mu}$$
- If the Lorenz curve is twice differentiable, then the probability density function f(x) exists at that point and:
  $$\frac{d^2 L(F)}{d F^2} = \frac{1}{\mu\,f(x(F))}\,$$
- If L(F) is continuously differentiable, then the tangent of L(F) is parallel to the line of perfect equality at the point F(μ). This is also the point at which the equality gap F − L(F), the vertical distance between the Lorenz curve and the line of perfect equality, is greatest. The size of the gap is equal to half of the relative mean absolute deviation:
  $$F(\mu) - L(F(\mu)) = \frac{\text{mean absolute deviation}}{2\,\mu}$$

== Examples ==
Both L(F) = F^{P} and L(F) = 1 − (1 − F)^{1/P}, for P ≥ 1, are well-known functional forms for the Lorenz curve.

== See also ==
- Distribution (economics)
- Distribution of wealth
- Welfare economics
- Income inequality metrics
- Gini coefficient
- Hoover index (a.k.a. Robin Hood index)
- ROC analysis
- Social welfare (political science)
- Economic inequality
- Zipf's law
- Pareto distribution
- Mean deviation
- Elephant curve
