= Economic inequality =

Distribution of income or wealth between different groups

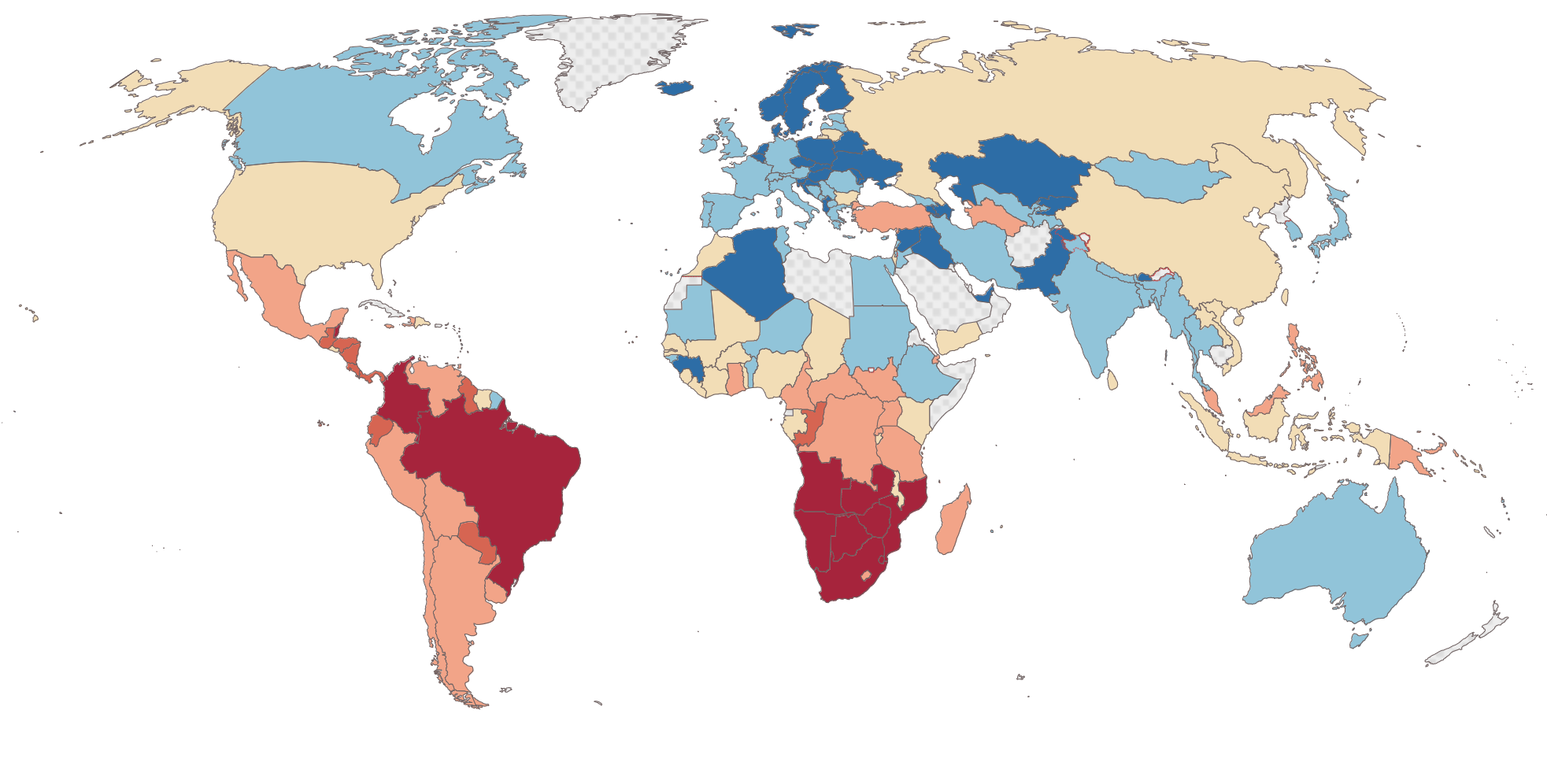
Global map of countries by high inequality (based on Gini index), 2022, according to the Poverty and Inequality Platform (PIP): <30; 30–35; 35–40; 40–45; 45–50; 50+

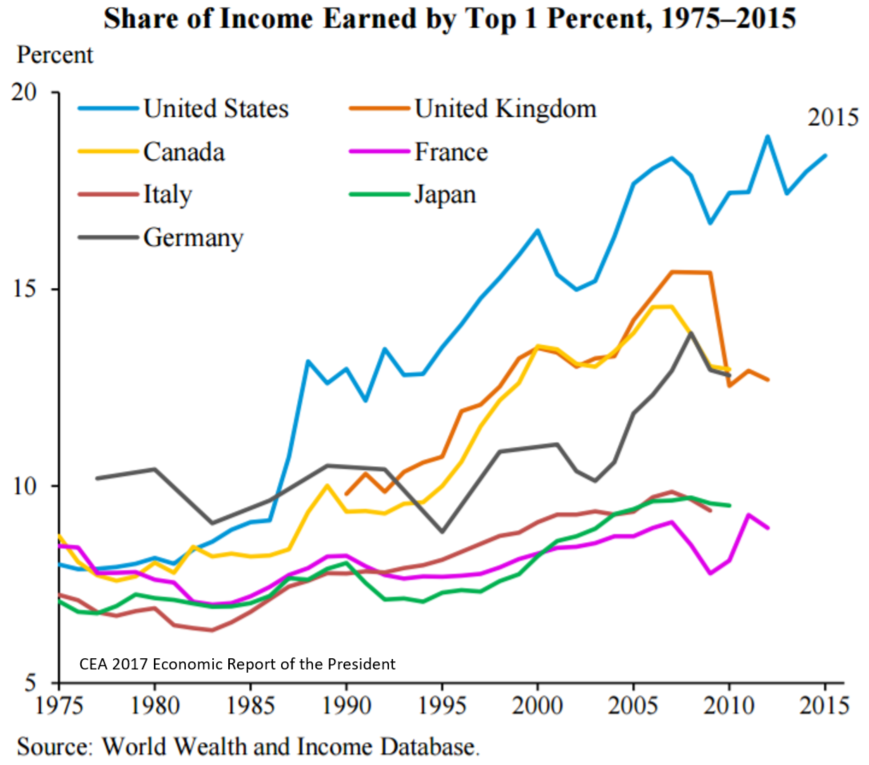
Share of income of the top 1% for the G7 developed countries, 1975 to 2015

Economic inequality is an umbrella term for three concepts: income inequality, how the total sum of money paid to people is distributed among them; wealth inequality, how the total sum of wealth owned by people is distributed among the owners; and consumption inequality, how the total sum of money spent by people is distributed among the spenders. Each of these can be measured between two or more nations, within a single nation, or between and within sub-populations (such as within a low-income group, within a high-income group, and between them, within an age group and between inter-generational groups, within a gender group and between them, etc.), either from one or from multiple nations.

Income inequality metrics are used for measuring income inequality, the Gini coefficient being a widely used one. Another type of measurement is the Inequality-adjusted Human Development Index, a composite index that accounts for inequality. Important concepts of equality include equity, equality of outcome, and equality of opportunity.

Historically, there has been a long-run trend towards greater economic inequality over time. The exceptions to this during the modern era are the declines in economic inequality during the two World Wars and amid the creation of modern welfare states after World War II. Whereas globalization has reduced the inequality between nations, it has increased the inequality within most nations. Income inequality between nations peaked in the 1970s, when world income was distributed bimodally into "rich" and "poor" countries. Since then, income levels across countries have been converging, with most people now living in middle-income countries. However, inequality within most nations has risen significantly in the last 30 years, particularly among advanced countries.

Inequality is a central issue in economic policy debate across the globe because government tax and spending policies have significant effects on income distribution. Research has generally linked economic inequality to political and social instability, democratic breakdown and civil conflict. Research also suggests that greater inequality hinders economic growth and macroeconomic stability, and that inequality of land and human capital reduce growth more than inequality of income.

== Measurements ==
The Gini coefficient (also known as the Gini index or Gini ratio) is a measure of statistical dispersion that represents income, wealth, or consumption inequality within a nation or social group. It measures the inequality among the values in a frequency distribution, such as income levels. A Gini coefficient of 0 reflects perfect equality, where all income or wealth values are the same. In contrast, a Gini coefficient of 1 (or 100%) reflects maximal inequality among values, a situation where a single individual has all the income or wealth while all others have none.

Oxfam's 2021 report on global inequality said that the COVID-19 pandemic had increased economic inequality substantially; the wealthiest people across the globe were impacted the least by the pandemic and their fortunes recovered quickest, with billionaires seeing their wealth increase by $3.9 trillion, while at the same time the number of people living on less than $5.50 a day likely increased by 500 million. According to economist Joseph Stiglitz, the pandemic's "most significant outcome" will be rising economic inequality in the United States and between the developed and developing world. Oxfam's 2026 report on economic inequality found that the number of billionaires has increased to 3,000, and their wealth has increased to 18.3 trillion, breaking records. Oxfam posits that this gives billionaires undue influence over politics and the media. Conversely, nearly half the global population still lives in poverty. The report cites corporate power as the driver of growing inequality, as corporations reap record profits, workers continue to struggle.

In 2016, the world's billionaires increased their combined global wealth to a record $6 trillion. In 2017, they increased their collective wealth to $8.9 trillion.

The existing data and estimates suggest a large increase in international (and more generally inter-macroregional) components between 1820 and 1960. It might have slightly decreased since then, at the expense of increased inequality within countries. The United Nations Development Programme in 2014 asserted that greater investments in social security, jobs, and laws that protect vulnerable populations are necessary to prevent widening income inequality.

According to a 2020 study, global earnings inequality has decreased substantially since 1970. During the 2000s and 2010s, the share of earnings by the world's poorest half doubled. Two researchers claim that global income inequality is decreasing due to strong economic growth in developing countries. According to a January 2020 report by the United Nations Department of Economic and Social Affairs, economic inequality between states had declined, but intrastate inequality has increased for 70% of the world population over the period 1990–2015. In 2015, the OECD reported in 2015 that income inequality is higher than it has ever been within OECD member nations and is at increased levels in many emerging economies. According to a June 2015 report by the International Monetary Fund (IMF):

Widening income inequality is the defining challenge of our time. In advanced economies, the gap between the rich and poor is at its highest level in decades. Inequality trends have been more mixed in emerging markets and developing countries (EMDCs), with some countries experiencing declining inequality, but pervasive inequities in access to education, health care, and finance remain.

In October 2017, the IMF warned that inequality within nations, despite global inequality falling in recent decades, has risen sharply enough to threaten economic growth and could result in further political polarization. The Fund's Fiscal Monitor report said that "progressive taxation and transfers are key components of efficient fiscal redistribution." In October 2018, Oxfam published a Reducing Inequality Index which measured social spending, tax and workers' rights to show which countries were best at closing the gap between the rich and the poor.

The 2022 World Inequality Report, a four-year research project organized by the economists Lucas Chancel, Thomas Piketty, Emmanuel Saez, and Gabriel Zucman, shows that "the world is marked by a very high level of income inequality and an extreme level of wealth inequality" and that these inequalities "seem to be about as great today as they were at the peak of western imperialism in the early 20th century". According to the report, the bottom half of the population owns 2% of global wealth, while the top 10% owns 76% of it. The top 1% owns 38%. The 2026 report showed that wealth inequality continues to increase around the world, with the richest 10% of the global population owning 75% of global wealth, while the bottom half owned only 2%. The report also noted that the richest 1% are wealthier than the bottom 90%, and the richest 0.001% own 3 times the wealth of half the world's population.

Globally in 2023, this is how much after-tax annual income it took, in U.S. dollars, for someone to be in the top 1% of income earners:

- Single adult with no children: $60,000
- Two adults with one child: $130,000
- Two adults with two children: $160,000

=== Income ===
==== Income distribution within individual countries ====
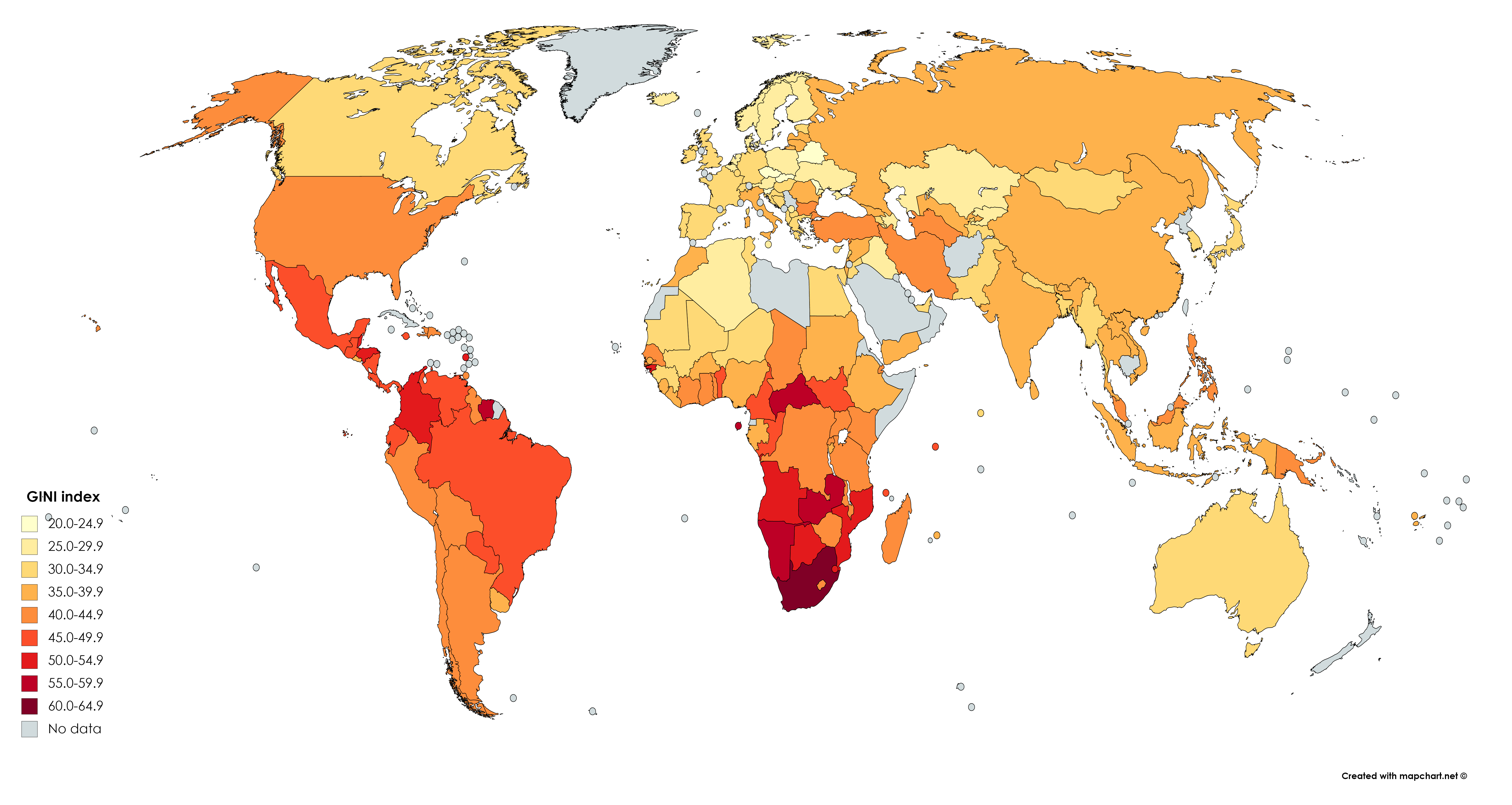
Countries' income inequality according to their most recent reported Gini index values as of 2018

In 1820, the ratio between the income of the top and bottom 20 percent of the world's population was three to one. By 1991, it was eighty-six to one. A 2011 study titled "Divided we Stand: Why Inequality Keeps Rising" by the Organisation for Economic Co-operation and Development (OECD) sought to explain the causes for this rising inequality by investigating economic inequality in OECD countries; it concluded that the following factors played a role:

- Changes in the structure of households can play an important role. Single-headed households in OECD countries have risen from an average of 15% in the late 1980s to 20% in the mid-2000s, resulting in higher inequality.
- Assortative mating refers to the phenomenon of people marrying people with similar backgrounds, for example, doctors marrying other doctors rather than nurses. OECD found that 40% of couples where both partners work belonged to the same or neighboring earnings deciles, compared with 33% some 20 years earlier.
- In the bottom percentiles, the number of hours worked has decreased.
- The main reason for increasing inequality seems to be the difference between the demand for and supply of skills.

The study made the following conclusions about the level of economic inequality:

- Income inequality in OECD countries is at its highest level for the past half-century. The ratio between the bottom 10% and the top 10% has increased from 1:7 to 1:9 in 25 years.
- There are tentative signs of a possible convergence of inequality levels towards a common and higher average level across OECD countries.
- With very few exceptions (France, Japan, and Spain), the wages of the 10% best-paid workers have risen relative to those of the 10% lowest paid.

A 2011 OECD study investigated economic inequality in Argentina, Brazil, China, India, Indonesia, Russia, and South Africa. It concluded that key sources of inequality in these countries include "a large, persistent informal sector, widespread regional divides (e.g., urban–rural), gaps in access to education, and barriers to employment and career progression for women".

Countries by the inequality-adjusted Human Development Index

Income inequality is measured by the Gini coefficient (expressed as a %), which ranges from 0 to 1. Here, 0 represents perfect equality, meaning everyone has the same income, whereas 1 represents perfect inequality, meaning one person has all the income and others have none. A Gini index value above 50% is considered high; countries such as Brazil, Colombia, South Africa, Botswana, and Honduras fall into this category. A Gini index value of 30% or above is considered medium; countries including Vietnam, Mexico, Poland, the United States, Argentina, Russia and Uruguay can be found in this category. A Gini index below 30% is considered low; countries such as Austria, Germany, Denmark, Norway, Slovenia, Sweden, and Ukraine fall into this category. In the low-income inequality category (below 30%) is a wide representation of countries previously being part of Soviet Union or its satellites, like Slovakia, Czech Republic, Ukraine and Hungary.

In 2012, the Gini index for income inequality for the whole European Union was only 30.6%.

Income distribution can differ from wealth distribution within each country. The Gini index also measures wealth inequality. There the higher Gini index signify greater inequality within the wealth distribution in country, 0 means total wealth equality and 1 represents situation, where everyone has no wealth, except an individual that has everything. For instance, countries like Denmark, Norway, and the Netherlands, all belonging to the last category (below 30%, low income inequality), also have very high Gini indices for wealth distribution, ranging from 70% to 90%.

=== Wealth ===
==== Wealth distribution between countries ====
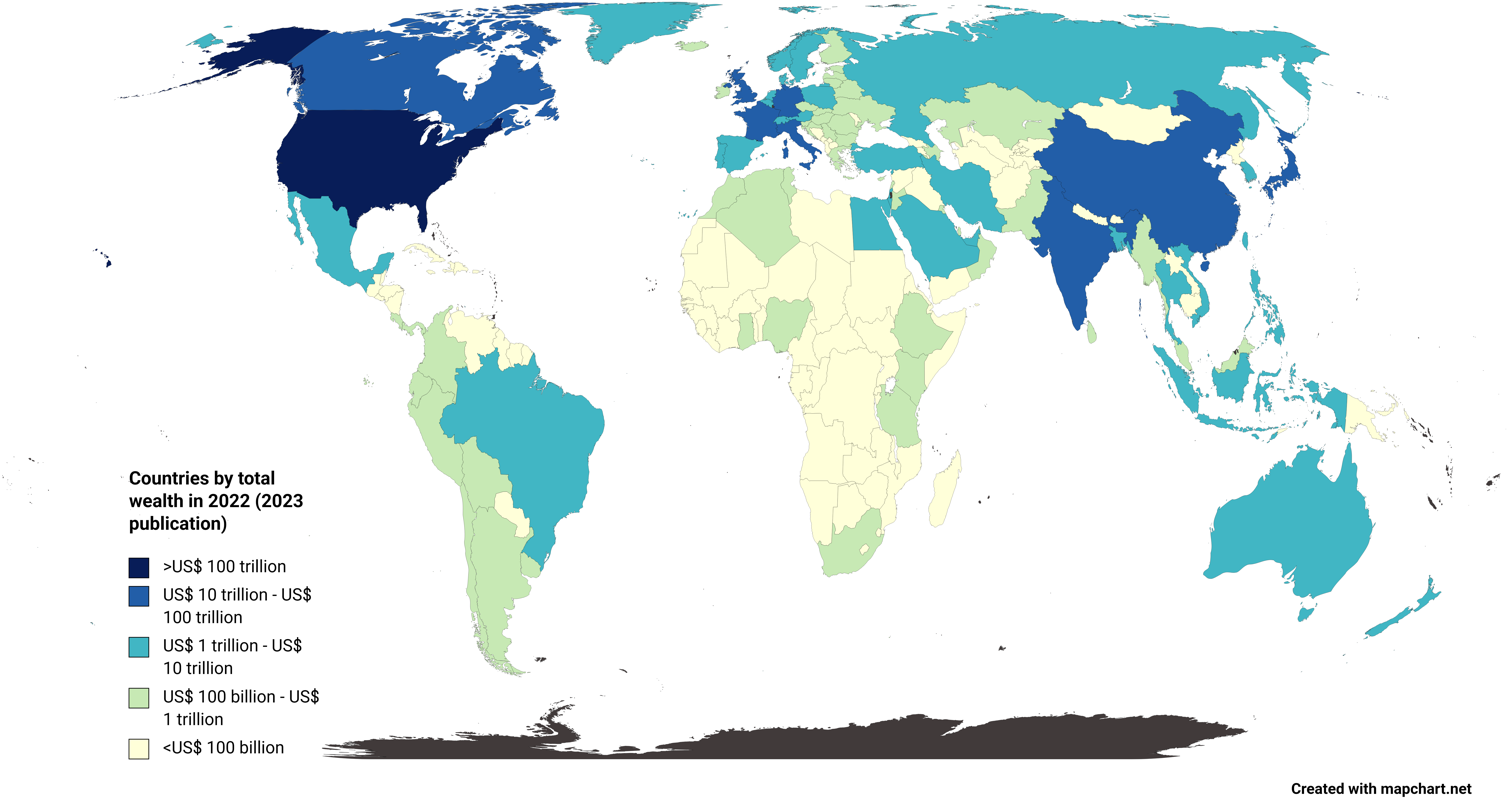
Countries by total wealth (2022)

==== Wealth distribution within individual countries ====
The wealth is calculated by various factors, for instance: liabilities, debts, exchange rates and their expected development, real estate prices, human resources, natural resources and technical advancements, etc.

=== Consumption ===
In economics, the consumption distribution or consumption inequality is an alternative to the income distribution or wealth distribution for judging economic inequality, comparing levels of consumption rather than income or wealth. This is an important measure of inequality as the basic utility of the wealth or income is the expenditure. People experience the inequality directly in consumption, rather than income or wealth.

== Factors proposed to affect economic inequality ==
There are various reasons for economic inequality within societies, including both global market dynamics (such as trade, development, and regulation) and social factors (including gender, race, and education). Recent growth in overall income inequality, at least within the OECD countries, has been driven mostly by increasing inequality in wages and salaries.

Economist Thomas Piketty argues that widening economic disparity is an inevitable phenomenon of free market capitalism when the rate of return of capital (r) is greater than the rate of growth of the economy (g). According to an IMF report in 2016, after reviewing four decades of neoliberalism, it had warned that certain neoliberal policies, including privatization, public spending cuts, and deregulation, have resulted in "increased inequality" and are stunting economic growth globally.

Jason Hickel and Dylan Sullivan contend that inequality has always and will continue to exist under capitalism because capital accumulation requires access to cheap labor, and lots of it, as without it the system would collapse.

=== Labour market ===
In modern market economies, if competition is imperfect, information is unevenly distributed, opportunities to acquire education and skills are unequal, and market failure results. Many such imperfect conditions exist in virtually every market. According to Joseph Stiglitz, this means there is enormous potential for the government to correct such market failures.

In the United States, real wages have been flat over the past 40 years for occupations across income and education levels, e.g., auto mechanics, cashiers, doctors, and software engineers. However, stock ownership favors higher income and education levels, thereby resulting in disparate investment income.

=== Taxes ===
Another cause is the rate at which income is taxed, coupled with the progressivity of the tax system. A progressive tax is a tax by which the tax rate increases as the taxable base amount increases. In a progressive tax system, the level of the top tax rate will often have a direct impact on the level of inequality within a society, either increasing it or decreasing it, provided that income does not change as a result of the change in tax regime. Additionally, steeper tax progressivity applied to social spending can result in more redistribution of income and wealth. Tax credits such as the Earned Income Tax Credit in the US can also decrease income inequality. The difference between the Gini index for an income distribution before taxation and the Gini index after taxation is an indicator for the effects of such taxation.

=== Education ===
Ivy-Plus university admissions rates vary with the income of the students' parents, with the acceptance rate of the top 0.1% income percentile being almost twice as much as other students.

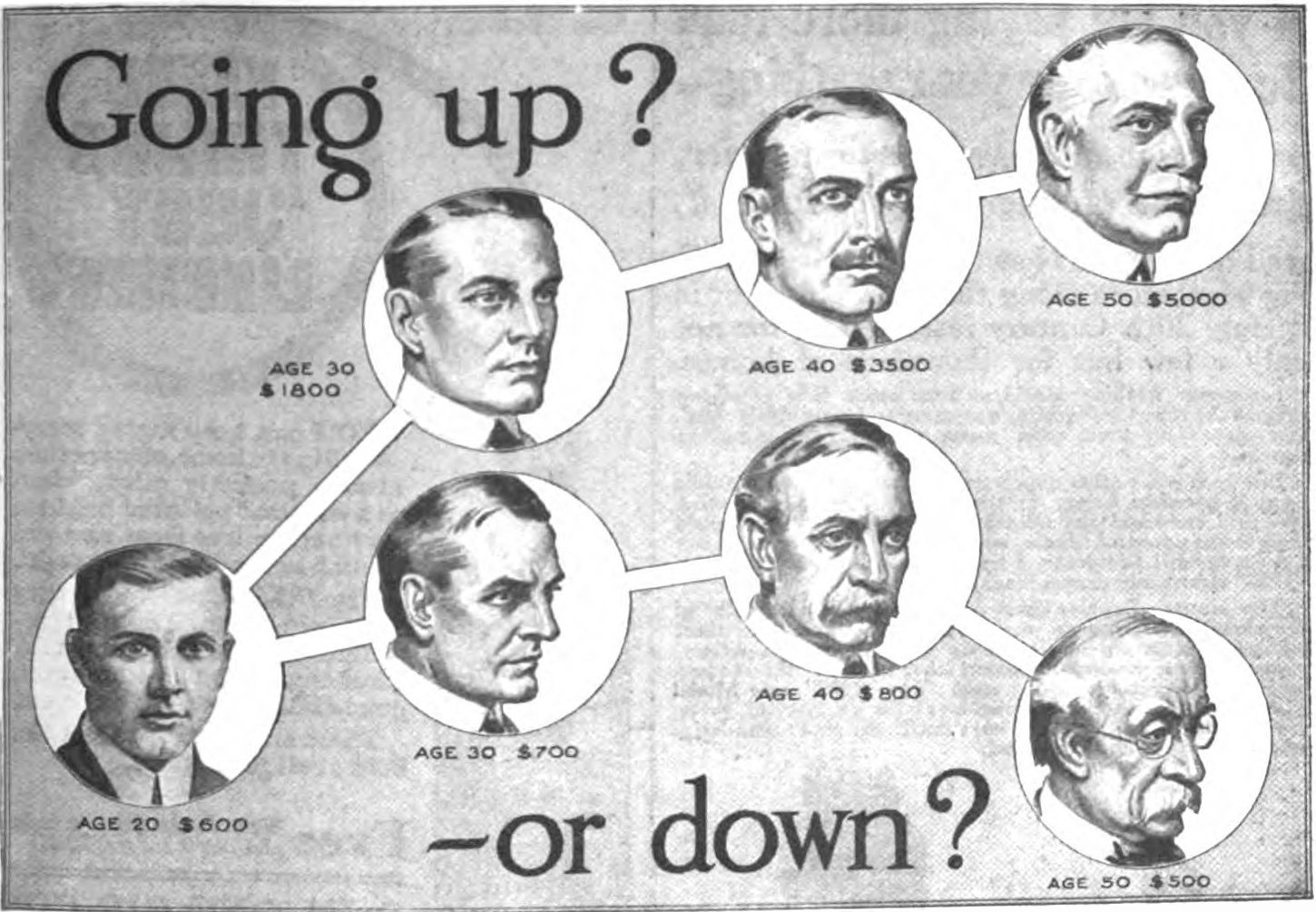
A 1916 ad for a vocational school appealed to Americans' belief in the possibility of self-betterment, as well as threatening economic insecurity through lack of education and the consequences of downward mobility in the income inequality during the Industrial Revolution

An important factor in the creation of inequality is variation in individuals' access to education. Education, especially in an area where there is a high demand for workers, creates high wages for those with this education. However, increases in education first increase and then decrease growth as well as income inequality. As a result, those who are unable to afford an education or choose not to pursue optional education generally receive much lower wages. The justification for this is that a lack of education leads directly to lower incomes, and thus lower aggregate saving and investment. Conversely, quality education raises incomes and promotes growth by unleashing the productive potential of people experiencing poverty.

Access to education was, in turn, influenced by land inequalities. In the less industrialized parts of 19th-century Europe, for example, landowners still held more political power than industrialists. These landowners did not benefit as much from educating their workers as industrialists did, since "educated workers have more incentives to migrate to urban, industrial areas than their less educated counterparts." Consequently, lower incentives to promote education in regions where land inequality was high led to lower levels of numeracy in these regions.

=== Economic liberalism, deregulation, and decline of unions ===
John Schmitt and Ben Zipperer (2006) of the CEPR point to economic liberalism, the reduction of business regulation, and the decline of union membership as one of the causes of economic inequality. In 2016, the International Monetary Fund has published studies which found that the decline of unionization in many advanced economies and the establishment of neoliberal economics have fueled rising income inequality. Further, Harvard University's Health and Human Rights Journal writes that neoliberalism has led to "a marked increase in economic inequality", with other studies having similar findings. Contrary to the proponents of neoliberalism, what is referred to as trickle-down economics have been proven not to be effective in resolving economic inequalities but have instead worsened them.

=== Technology ===
The growing importance of information technology has been credited with increasing income inequality. Technology has been called "the main driver of the recent increases in inequality" by Erik Brynjolfsson, of MIT. In arguing against this explanation, Jonathan Rothwell notes that if high rates of invention measure technological advancement, there is a negative correlation between it and inequality. Countries with high invention rates – "as measured by patent applications filed under the Patent Cooperation Treaty" – exhibit lower inequality than those with lower rates. In one country, the United States, "salaries of engineers and software developers rarely reach" above $390,000/year (the lower limit for the top 1% earners).

Some researchers, such as Juliet B. Schor, highlight the role of for-profit online sharing-economy platforms as accelerators of income inequality and call into question their supposed contribution to empowering outsiders in the labour market.

Taking the example of TaskRabbit, a labour service platform, she shows that a large proportion of providers already have a stable full-time job and participate part-time in the platform as an opportunity to increase their income by diversifying their activities outside employment, which tends to restrict the volume of work remaining for the minority of platform workers.

In addition, there is an important phenomenon of labour substitution as manual tasks traditionally performed by workers without a degree (or just a college degree) integrated into the labour market in the traditional economy sectors are now performed by workers with a high level of education (in 2013, 70% of TaskRabbit's workforce held a bachelor's degree, 20% a master's degree and 5% a PhD). The development of platforms, which are increasingly capturing demand for these manual services at the expense of non-platform companies, may therefore benefit mainly skilled workers who are offered more earning opportunities that can be used as supplemental or transitional work during periods of unemployment.

It has also been proposed that information technologies contribute to "winner take most" market concentration, reducing the need for labor across competing suppliers. Market concentration drives down labor's share of the GDP, increasing the wealth of capital and thereby exacerbating inequality.

==== Automation ====
Economists have linked automation to increases in economic inequality, as it raises the returns to wealth and contributes to wage stagnation at the lower end of the wage distribution. Several economists have suggested that automation has increased income inequality by causing low skill jobs to be replaced with machines operated by technologically skilled workers, thereby reducing the demand for unskilled labor while increasing the demand for skilled labor.

=== Globalization ===
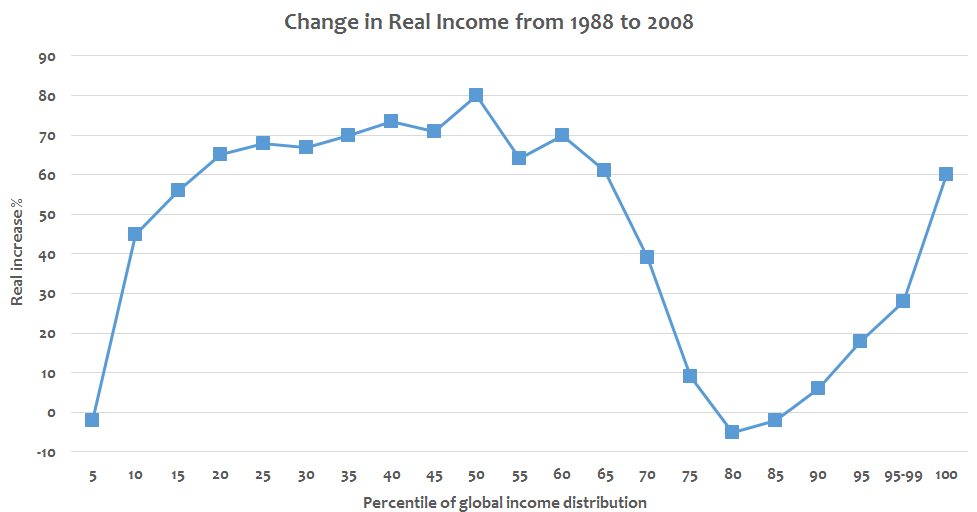
"Elephant curve": Change in real income between 1988 and 2008 at various income percentiles of global income distribution

Trade liberalization may shift economic inequality from a global to a domestic scale. When rich countries trade with poor countries, the low-skilled workers in the rich countries may see reduced wages as a result of the competition, while low-skilled workers in the poor countries may see increased wages. Trade economist Paul Krugman estimates that trade liberalisation has had a measurable effect on the rising inequality in the United States. He attributes this trend to increased trade with poorer countries and the fragmentation of the means of production, which makes low-skilled jobs more tradable.

Anthropologist Jason Hickel contends that globalization and "structural adjustment" set off the "race to the bottom", a significant driver of surging global inequality. Another driver Hickel mentions is the debt system, which advanced the need for structural adjustment in the first place.

=== Gender ===
The gender gap in median earnings of full-time employees according to the OECD 2015

In many countries, there is a gender pay gap in favor of males in the labor market. Several factors other than discrimination contribute to this gap. On average, women are more likely than men to consider factors other than pay when looking for work and may be less willing to travel or relocate. Thomas Sowell, in his book Knowledge and Decisions, claims that this difference is due to women not taking jobs due to marriage or pregnancy. A U.S. Census's report stated that in US once other factors are accounted for there is still a difference in earnings between women and men. A study done on three post-soviet countries Armenia, Georgia, and Azerbaijan reveals that gender is one of the driving forces of income inequality, and being female has a significant negative effect on income when other factors are held equal. The results show more than 50% gender pay gap in all three countries. These findings are because usually employers tend to avoid hiring women because of possible maternity leave. Another reason for this is occupational segregation, which means women are typically concentrated in lower-paid positions and sectors, such as social services and education.

=== Age ===
Income tends to differ by age, in favor of higher age groups. Discrimination by age is called ageism.

=== Race ===
There is also a globally recognized disparity in the wealth, income, and economic welfare of people of different races. In many nations, data exists to suggest that members of certain racial demographics experience lower wages, fewer opportunities for career and educational advancement, and intergenerational wealth gaps. Studies have uncovered the emergence of what is called "ethnic capital", by which people belonging to a race that has experienced discrimination are born into a disadvantaged family from the beginning and therefore have less resources and opportunities at their disposal. The universal lack of education, technical and cognitive skills, and inheritable wealth within a particular race is often passed down between generations, compounding in effect to make escaping these racialized cycles of poverty increasingly difficult. Additionally, ethnic groups that experience significant disparities are often also minorities, at least in representation, though often in number as well, in the nations where they experience the harshest disadvantage. As a result, they are often segregated either by government policy or social stratification, leading to ethnic communities that experience widespread gaps in wealth and aid.

Redlining intentionally excluded black Americans from accumulating intergenerational wealth. The effects of this exclusion on black Americans' health continue to play out daily, generations later, in the same communities. This is evident currently in the disproportionate effects that COVID-19 has had on the same communities that the HOLC redlined in the 1930s. Research published in September 2020 overlaid maps of the highly affected COVID-19 areas with the HOLC maps, showing that those areas marked "risky" to lenders because they contained minority residents were the same neighborhoods most affected by COVID-19. The Centers for Disease Control and Prevention (CDC) examines inequities in the social determinants of health, such as concentrated poverty and healthcare access, that are interrelated and influence COVID-19 health outcomes and, more broadly, quality of life for minority groups. The CDC points to discrimination within health care, education, criminal justice, housing, and finance, direct results of systematically subversive tactics like redlining, which led to chronic and toxic stress that shaped social and economic factors for minority groups, increasing their risk for COVID-19. Healthcare access is similarly limited by factors like a lack of public transportation, child care, and communication and language barriers, which result from the spatial and economic isolation of minority communities from redlining. Educational, income, and wealth gaps that result from this isolation mean that minority groups' limited access to the job market may force them to remain in fields that have a higher risk of exposure to the virus, without options to take time off. Finally, a direct result of redlining is the overcrowding of minority groups into neighborhoods that do not boast adequate housing to sustain burgeoning populations, leading to crowded conditions that make prevention strategies for COVID-19 nearly impossible to implement.

As a general rule, races that have been historically and systematically colonized (typically indigenous ethnicities) continue to experience lower levels of financial stability in the present day. The global South is considered particularly vulnerable to this phenomenon, though the exact socioeconomic manifestations vary across regions.

==== Westernized Nations ====
While the progression of civil rights movements and justice reform has improved access to education and other economic opportunities in politically advanced nations, racial income and wealth disparity still exist. In the United States for example, African American populations are more likely to drop out of high school and college, are typically employed for fewer hours at lower wages, have lower than average intergenerational wealth, and are more likely to use welfare as young adults than their white counterparts. The racial wealth gap in the US has been maintained throughout history. In 1863, two years before emancipation from slavery, Black people owned 0.5 percent of the US national wealth, while in 2019, it was just over 1.5 percent.

Mexican-Americans, while suffering less debilitating socioeconomic factors than black Americans, experience deficiencies in the same areas when compared to whites and have not assimilated financially to the level of stability experienced by white Americans as a whole. These experiences are the effects of the measured disparity due to race in countries like the US, where studies show that in comparison to whites, blacks suffer from drastically lower levels of upward mobility, higher levels of downward mobility, and poverty that is more easily transmitted to offspring as a result of the disadvantage stemming from the era of slavery and post-slavery racism that has been passed through racial generations to the present. These are lasting financial inequalities that apply in varying magnitudes to most non-white populations in nations such as the US, the UK, France, Spain, Australia, etc.

==== Latin America ====
In the countries of the Caribbean, Central America, and South America, many ethnicities continue to deal with the effects of European colonization, and in general, nonwhites tend to be noticeably poorer than whites in this region. In many countries with significant populations of indigenous races and those of African descent (such as Mexico, Colombia, Chile, etc.), income levels can be roughly half as high as those experienced by white demographics, and this inequity is accompanied by systematically unequal access to education, career opportunities, and poverty relief. This region of the world, apart from urbanizing areas like Brazil and Costa Rica, continues to be understudied, and often the racial disparity is denied by Latin Americans who consider themselves to be living in post-racial and post-colonial societies far removed from intense social and economic stratification, despite the evidence to the contrary.

==== Africa ====
African countries, too, continue to deal with the effects of the Trans-Atlantic Slave Trade, which set back economic development as a whole for blacks of African citizenship more than any other region. The degree to which colonizers stratified their holdings on the continent based on race has had a direct correlation with the magnitude of disparity experienced by nonwhites in the nations that eventually rose from their colonial status. Former French colonies, for example, see much higher rates of income inequality between whites and nonwhites as a result of the rigid hierarchy imposed by the French who lived in Africa at the time. Another example is found in South Africa, which, still reeling from the socioeconomic impacts of Apartheid, experiences some of the highest racial income and wealth inequality in all of Africa. In these and other countries like Nigeria, Zimbabwe, and Sierra Leone, movements of civil reform have initially led to improved access to financial advancement opportunities, but data shows that for nonwhites this progress is either stalling or erasing itself in the newest generation of blacks that seek education and improved transgenerational wealth. The economic status of one's parents continues to define and predict the financial futures of African and minority ethnic groups.

==== Asia ====
Asian regions and countries such as China, the Middle East, and Central Asia have been vastly understudied in terms of racial disparity, but even here, the effects of Western colonization provide similar results to those found in other parts of the globe. Additionally, cultural and historical practices such as the caste system in India leave their marks as well. While the disparity is greatly improving in the case of India, there still exists social stratification between peoples of lighter and darker skin tones that cumulatively result in income and wealth inequality, manifesting in many of the same poverty traps seen elsewhere.

=== Economic development ===
Economist Simon Kuznets argued that levels of economic inequality are in large part the result of stages of development. According to the Kuznets curve, countries with low levels of development have relatively equal distributions of wealth. In the early stages, individual sectors or industries develop first, leading to an unequal distribution of income and wealth and growing inequality within a country. As the economy progresses and development takes place in more economic sectors, eventually attracting more workers, economic inequality decreases. Although the Kuznets curve described the development of inequality well at the time of its publication, there is now a growing number of critical voices questioning the link between inequality and development.

=== Wealth concentration ===
Wealth concentration is the process by which, under certain conditions, newly created wealth concentrates in the possession of already-wealthy individuals or entities. Accordingly, those who already hold wealth have the means to invest in new sources of wealth creation or otherwise leverage their accumulated wealth, and thus they are the beneficiaries of the new wealth. Over time, wealth concentration can significantly contribute to the persistence of inequality within society.

Thomas Piketty in his book Capital in the Twenty-First Century argues that the fundamental force for divergence is the usually greater return of capital ($r$—wealth, assets, etc.) than economic growth ($g$) and that larger fortunes generate higher returns. He claims that capitalism naturally tends towards wealth concentration unless counterbalanced, with slower economic growth making the problem worse because wealth still compounds even when the broader economy (and thus wages) slows.

=== Rent seeking ===
Economist Joseph Stiglitz argues that, rather than explaining concentrations of wealth and income, market forces should serve as a brake on such concentrations, which are better explained by the non-market force known as "rent-seeking". While the market will bid up compensation for rare and desired skills to reward wealth creation, greater productivity, etc., it will also prevent successful entrepreneurs from earning excess profits by fostering competition that cuts prices, profits, and large compensation. A better explainer of growing inequality, according to Stiglitz, is the use of political power generated by wealth by certain groups to shape government policies financially beneficial to them. This process, known to economists as rent-seeking, brings income not from creation of wealth but from "grabbing a larger share of the wealth that would otherwise have been produced without their effort".

=== Finance industry ===
Jamie Galbraith argues that countries with larger financial sectors have greater inequality, and the link is not an accident.

=== Global warming and climate change ===
Scaling the effect of wealth to the national level: richer (developed) countries emit more CO_{2} per person than poorer (developing) countries. Emissions are roughly proportional to GDP per person, though the rate of increase diminishes with average GDP/pp of about $10,000.

Though total CO_{2} emissions (size of pie charts) differ substantially among high-emitting regions, the pattern of higher income classes emitting more than lower income classes is consistent across regions. The world's top 1% of emitters emit over 1000 times more than the bottom 1%.

A 2019 study published in PNAS found that global warming contributes to rising economic inequality between countries, boosting economic growth in developed countries while hampering growth in developing nations in the Global South. The study says that 25% of the gap between the developed and developing world can be attributed to global warming.

A 2020 report by Oxfam and the Stockholm Environment Institute says that the wealthiest 10% of the global population were responsible for more than half of global carbon dioxide emissions from 1990 to 2015, which increased by 60%. According to a 2020 report by the UNEP, overconsumption by the rich is a significant driver of the climate crisis. The wealthiest 1% of the world's population are responsible for more than double the greenhouse gas emissions of the poorest 50% combined. Inger Andersen, in the foreword to the report, said: "This elite will need to reduce their footprint by a factor of 30 to stay in line with the Paris Agreement targets." A 2022 report by Oxfam found that the business investments of the wealthiest 125 billionaires emit 393 million metric tonnes of greenhouse gas emissions annually.

In July 2023, a letter sent to the United Nations secretary general António Guterres and World Bank president Ajay Banga by a group of over 200 economists from 67 countries, including Jayati Ghosh, Joseph Stiglitz and Thomas Piketty, warned that if the sharp increase in economic inequality is not reversed, it will "entrench poverty and increase the risk of climate breakdown".

According to UNCTAD's World Investment Report, poorer countries would need $4 trillion per year to accomplish the SDGs by 2030, up from $1.5 trillion in 2015. $1.7 trillion in green energy investment is required each year, while the majority of green foreign direct investment continues to flow to established nations.

=== Politics ===
Joseph Stiglitz argues in The Price of Inequality (2012) that the economic inequality is inevitable and permanent, because it is caused by the great amount of political power the richest have. He wrote, "While there may be underlying economic forces at play, politics have shaped the market, and shaped it in ways that advantage the top at the expense of the rest."

=== Culture and psychology ===
A 2024 study found different cultures can show on average different responses to incentives. A 2023 study found that differences in biased decision-making such as temporal discounting (i.e., not preferring immediate funds over larger future gains), overestimation (i.e. thinking you are better than you are at making decisions), over-placement (i.e. thinking you are better than the average person at making decisions), and extremeness aversion (i.e. taking the 'middle option' simply because it seems safer than the highest or lowest) does not explain differences in economic mobility. Differences in effortfulness can contribute to inequality.

== Mitigating factors ==
Social connectedness to people of higher income levels is a strong predictor of upward income mobility. However, data show substantial social segregation correlating with economic income groups.

Countries with a left-leaning legislature generally have lower levels of inequality. Many factors constrain economic inequality – they may be divided into two classes: market driven, and government sponsored. The relative merits and effectiveness of each approach are a subject of debate:

Market forces outside of government intervention that can reduce economic inequality include:

- Propensity to spend: with rising wealth and income, a person may spend more. In an extreme example, if one person owned everything, they would immediately need to hire people to maintain their properties, thus reducing the wealth concentration. Conversely, high-income persons have higher propensity to save. Robin Maialeh then shows that increasing economic wealth decreases propensity to spend and increases propensity to invest which consequently leads to even greater growth rate of already rich agents.

Typical government initiatives intended to reduce economic inequality include:

- Public education: increasing the supply of skilled labor and reducing income inequality due to education differentials.
- Progressive taxation: the rich are taxed proportionally more than the poor, reducing the amount of income inequality in society if the change in taxation does not cause changes in income.

Research shows that since 1300, the only periods with significant declines in wealth inequality in Europe were the Black Death and the two World Wars. Historian Walter Scheidel posits that, since the Stone Age, only extreme violence, catastrophes and upheaval in the form of total war, Communist revolutions, the French Revolution, pestilence and state collapse have significantly reduced inequality. He has stated that "only all-out thermonuclear war might fundamentally reset the existing distribution of resources" and that "peaceful policy reform may well prove unequal to the growing challenges ahead." However, Scheidel also stated that "There is certainly room for incremental change, that's what the example of Latin America shows in the past 15 years or so."

=== Policy responses intended to mitigate ===
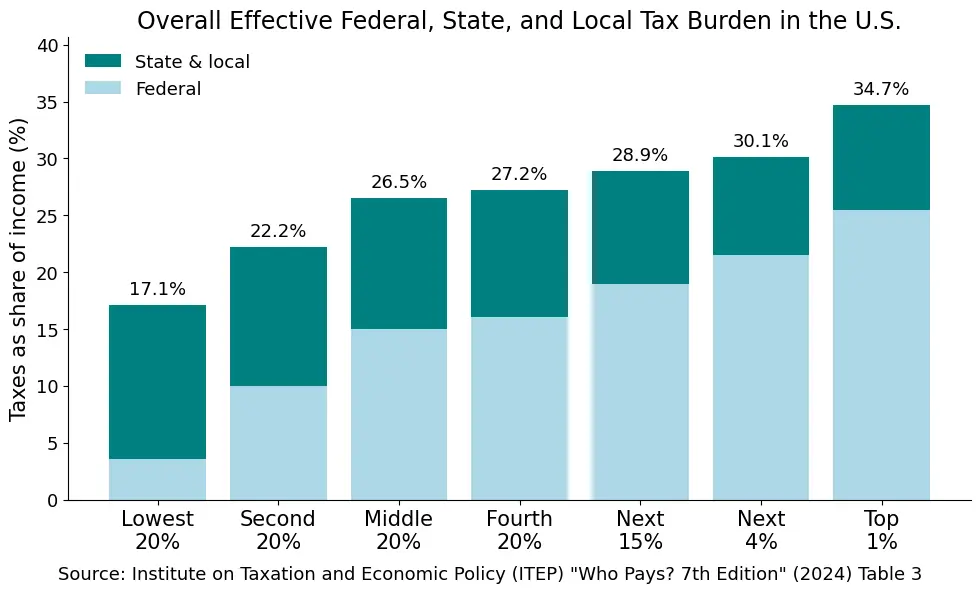
Overall tax burden in the US in 2024

A 2011 OECD study makes several suggestions to its member countries, including:

- Well-targeted income-support policies.
- Facilitation and encouragement of access to employment.
- Better job-related training and education for the low-skilled (on-the-job training) would help to boost their productivity potential and future earnings.
- Better access to formal education.

Progressive taxation reduces absolute income inequality when the higher rates on higher-income individuals are paid and not evaded, and transfer payments and social safety nets result in progressive government spending. Wage ratio legislation has also been proposed as a means of reducing income inequality. The OECD asserts that public spending is vital in reducing the ever-expanding wealth gap.

Deferred investment programs that increase stock ownership among lower-income groups can supplement income and offset wage stagnation.

The economists Emmanuel Saez and Thomas Piketty recommend much higher top marginal tax rates on the wealthy, up to 50 percent, 70 percent, or even 90 percent. Ralph Nader, Jeffrey Sachs, the United Front Against Austerity, among others, call for a financial transaction tax (also known as the Robin Hood tax) to bolster the social safety net and the public sector.

The Economist wrote in December 2013: "A minimum wage, providing it is not set too high, could thus boost pay with no ill effects on jobs....America's federal minimum wage, at 38% of median income, is one of the rich world's lowest. Some studies find no harm to employment from federal or state minimum wages, others see a small one, but none finds any serious damage."

General limitations on and taxation of rent-seeking are popular across the political spectrum.

Public policy responses addressing causes and effects of income inequality in the US include: progressive tax incidence adjustments, strengthening social safety net provisions such as Aid to Families with Dependent Children, welfare, the food stamp program, Social Security, Medicare, and Medicaid, organizing community interest groups, increasing and reforming higher education subsidies, increasing infrastructure spending, and placing limits on and taxing rent-seeking.

A 2017 study in the Journal of Political Economy by Daron Acemoglu, James Robinson and Thierry Verdier argues that American "cutthroat" capitalism and inequality give rise to technology and innovation that more "cuddly" forms of capitalism cannot. As a result, "the diversity of institutions we observe among relatively advanced countries, ranging from greater inequality and risk-taking in the United States to the more egalitarian societies supported by a strong safety net in Scandinavia, rather than reflecting differences in fundamentals between the citizens of these societies, may emerge as a mutually self-reinforcing world equilibrium. If so, in this equilibrium, 'we cannot all be like the Scandinavians,' because Scandinavian capitalism depends in part on the knowledge spillovers created by the more cutthroat American capitalism." A 2012 working paper by the same authors, making similar arguments, was challenged by Lane Kenworthy, who posited that, among other things, the Nordic countries are consistently ranked as some of the world's most innovative countries by the World Economic Forum's Global Competitiveness Index, with Sweden ranking as the most innovative nation, followed by Finland, for 2012–2013; the U.S. ranked sixth.

There are, however, global initiatives like the United Nations Sustainable Development Goal 10 which aim to garner international efforts in reducing economic inequality considerably by 2030.

== Effects ==
A lot of research has been done about the effects of economic inequality on different aspects of society:

- Health: For a long time, the higher material living standards have led to longer life, as those people were able to get enough food, water, and access to warmth. British researchers Richard G. Wilkinson and Kate Pickett have found higher rates of health and social problems (obesity, mental illness, homicides, teenage births, incarceration, child conflict, drug use) in countries and states with higher inequality. Their research included 24 developed countries, including most U.S. states, and found that in the more developed countries, such as Finland and Japan, the health issues are much lower than in states with rather higher inequality rates, such as Utah and New Hampshire. Some studies link a surge in "deaths of despair", suicide, drug overdoses, and alcohol related deaths, to widening income inequality. Conversely, other research did not find these effects or concluded that research suffered from issues of confounding variables.
- Social goods: British researchers Richard G. Wilkinson and Kate Pickett have found lower rates of social goods (life expectancy by country, educational performance, trust among strangers, women's status, social mobility, even numbers of patents issued) in countries and states with higher inequality.
- Social cohesion: Research has shown an inverse link between income inequality and social cohesion. In more equal societies, people are much more likely to trust each other, and measures of social capital (the benefits of goodwill, fellowship, mutual sympathy, and social connectedness among groups that make up social units) suggest greater community involvement.
- Crime: The cross-national research shows that in societies with less economic inequality, the homicide rates are consistently lower. A 2016 study finds that interregional inequality increases terrorism. Other research found inequality has no or little effect on crime rates.
- Happiness: According to the 2019 World Happiness Report, increasing socioeconomic inequality, along with rising healthcare costs, surging addiction rates, and an unhealthy work–life balance, are causes of unhappiness around the world. Studies have found evidence that inequality reduces population-wide satisfaction and happiness.
- Poverty: A study made by Jared Bernstein and Elise Gould suggests that the poverty in the United States could have been reduced by the lowering of economic inequality over the past few decades.
- Debt: Income inequality has been the driving factor in the growing household debt, as high earners bid up the price of real estate and middle income earners go deeper into debt trying to maintain what once was a middle class lifestyle.
- Economic growth: A 2016 meta-analysis found that "the effect of inequality on growth is negative and more pronounced in less developed countries than in rich countries". However, the average impact on growth was not significant. The study also found that wealth inequality is more pernicious to growth than income inequality. Redistribution increases consumption but reduces incentives to work, reducing economic growth.
- Civic participation: Higher income inequality led to less of all forms of social, cultural, and civic participation among the less wealthy.
- Political instability: Studies indicate that economic inequality leads to greater political instability, including an increased risk of democratic breakdown and civil conflict. A significant impact of inequality on civil war probability has been found through anthropometric methods.
- Political party responses: One study finds that economic inequality prompts attempts by left-leaning politicians to pursue redistributive policies while right-leaning politicians seek to repress the redistributive policies.

== Perspectives ==
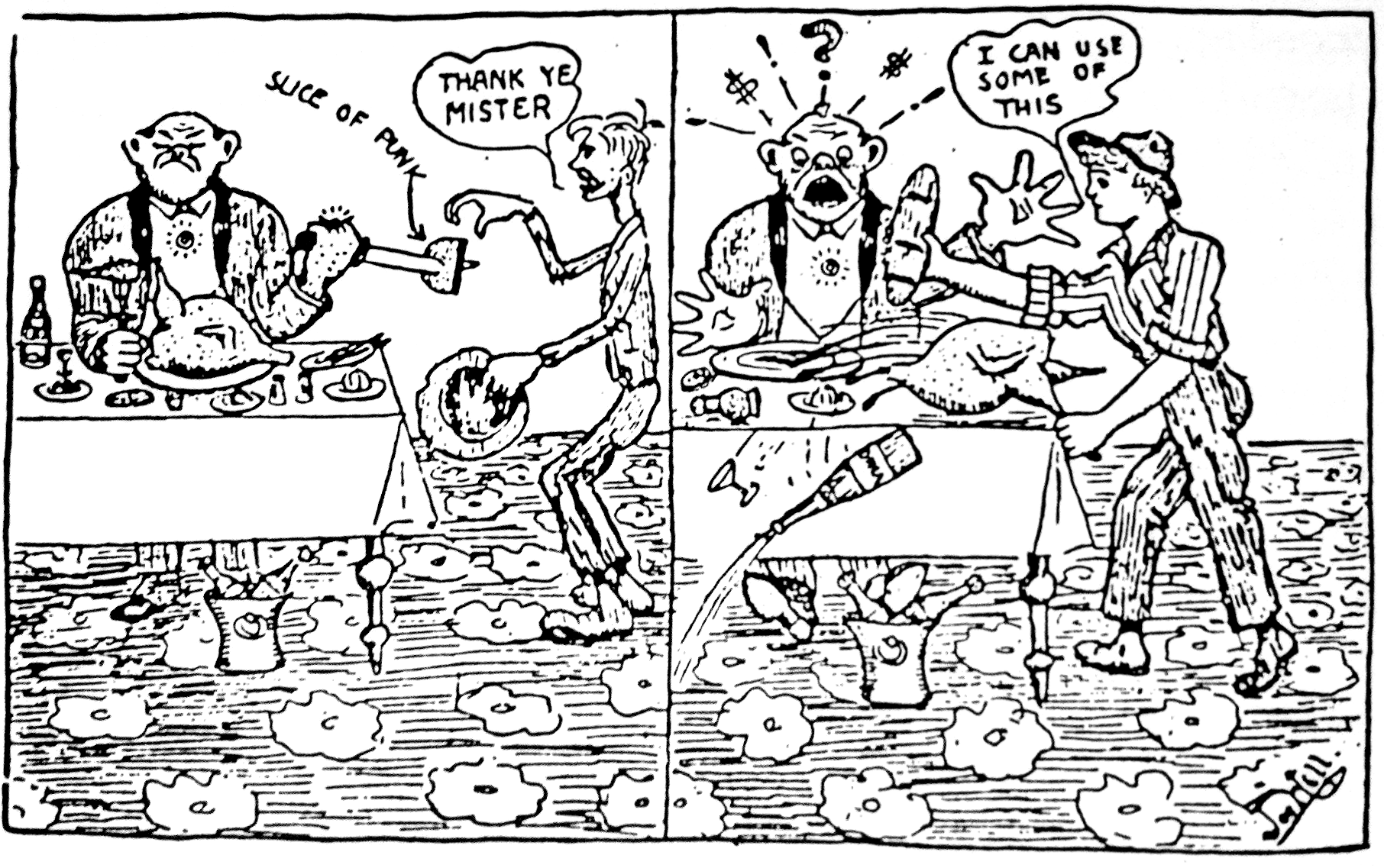
Comic strip by Swedish-American labor activist Joe Hill advocating a socialist perspective towards economic inequality.

=== Socialist perspectives ===
Socialists attribute the vast disparities in wealth to the private ownership of the means of production by a class of owners, creating a situation where a small portion of the population lives off unearned property income by virtue of ownership titles in capital equipment, financial assets, and corporate stock. By contrast, the vast majority of the population depends on income in the form of wages or salaries. In order to rectify this situation, socialists argue that the means of production should be socially owned so that income differentials would be reflective of individual contributions to the social product.

Marxian economics attributes rising inequality to job automation and capital deepening within capitalism. The process of job automation conflicts with the capitalist property form and its attendant system of wage labor. In this analysis, capitalist firms increasingly substitute capital equipment for labor inputs (workers) under competitive pressure to reduce costs and maximize profits. Over the long term, this trend increases the organic composition of capital, meaning that fewer workers are required relative to capital inputs, increasing unemployment (the "reserve army of labour"). This process exerts a downward pressure on wages. The substitution of capital equipment for labor (mechanization and automation) raises each worker's productivity, resulting in relatively stagnant wages for the working class amid rising levels of property income for the capitalist class.

Marxist socialists ultimately predict the emergence of a classless, communist society based on the common ownership of the means of production, in which each citizen would have free access to the means of consumption (From each according to his ability, to each according to his need). According to Marxist philosophy, equality in the sense of free access is essential for freeing individuals from dependent relationships, thereby allowing them to transcend alienation.

Some scholars on the left have posited that the end of the Soviet Union and communism as a global force allowed neoliberal capitalism to become a global system, which has resulted in rising economic inequality.

=== Meritocracy ===
Meritocracy favors a society in which an individual's success is a direct function of his merit or contribution. Economic inequality would be a natural consequence of the wide range of individual skills, talents, and effort in the human population. David Landes stated that the progression of Western economic development that led to the Industrial Revolution was facilitated by men advancing through their own merit rather than because of family or political connections.

=== Progressive and Keynesian perspectives ===
Progressives and social liberals (including centrist or left-of-center political groups) believe that the capitalist economic system should be fundamentally preserved, but the status quo regarding the income gap must be reformed. Social liberals favor a capitalist system with active Keynesian macroeconomic policies and progressive taxation (to reduce income inequality). Research indicates that people who hold liberal beliefs tend to see greater income inequality as morally wrong.

Stanford's Encyclopedia of Philosophy explains that the "new liberalism" emerged from three factors:

1. The ability of the free market to sustain full employment was increasingly under strain. Keynes believed that a private property based market could get stuck in an "equilibrium with high unemployment" and that the government should play an active role in influencing aggregate demand through fiscal and monetary policy.
2. Public faith in government as a means of "supervising economic life" was increasing. This can be attributed to apparent success at economic planning during the First World War and increased trust in elected officials and representative democracy.
3. There was a growing conviction that property rights "foster an unjust inequality of power", contrary to the saying that it is the "guardian of every other right". It is argued that they entrench "a merely formal equality" that in practice "systematically fails to secure the kind of equal positive liberty... for the working class".

=== Classical liberalism ===
Classical liberalism is a 17th–18th century political and economic ideology that advocates for free-market, laissez-faire economics and deregulation while opposing government intervention. It stands in contrast to social liberalism, which endorses a regulated market economy.

Contemporary classical liberals and libertarians generally do not take a stance on wealth inequality and instead believe in equality under the law, regardless of whether it results in unequal wealth distribution. In 1966 Ludwig von Mises, a prominent figure in the Austrian School of economic thought, explains:

The liberal champions of equality under the law were fully aware of the fact that men are born unequal and that it is precisely their inequality that generates social cooperation and civilization. Equality under the law was in their opinion not designed to correct the inexorable facts of the universe and to make natural inequality disappear. It was, on the contrary, the device to secure for the whole of mankind the maximum of benefits it can derive from it. Henceforth no man-made institutions should prevent a man from attaining that station in which he can best serve his fellow citizens.

Robert Nozick argued that government redistributes wealth by force (usually in the form of taxation), and that the ideal moral society would be one where all individuals are free from force. However, Nozick recognized that some modern economic inequalities resulted from the forceful taking of property, and that a certain amount of redistribution would be justified to compensate for this force, not because of the inequalities themselves. John Rawls argued in A Theory of Justice that inequalities in the distribution of wealth are only justified when they improve society as a whole, including the poorest members. Rawls does not discuss the full implications of his theory of justice. Some see Rawls's argument as a justification for capitalism since even the poorest members of society theoretically benefit from increased innovations under capitalism; others believe only a strong welfare state can satisfy Rawls's theory of justice.

Classical liberal Milton Friedman believed that if government action is taken in pursuit of economic equality, then political freedom would suffer. In a famous quote, he said:

A society that puts equality before freedom will get neither. A society that puts freedom before equality will get a high degree of both.

Economist Tyler Cowen has argued that although income inequality has increased within nations, it has fallen globally over the 20 years leading up to 2014. He argues that although income inequality may make individual nations worse off, overall, the world has improved as global inequality has decreased.

=== Social justice arguments ===
Patrick Diamond and Anthony Giddens (professors of Economics and Sociology, respectively) hold that "pure meritocracy is incoherent because, without redistribution, one generation's successful individuals would become the next generation's embedded caste, hoarding the wealth they had accumulated".

They also state that social justice requires redistribution of high incomes and large concentrations of wealth in a way that spreads it more widely, to "recognize the contribution made by all sections of the community to building the nation's wealth". (Patrick Diamond and Anthony Giddens, June 27, 2005, New Statesman)

Pope Francis stated in his Evangelii gaudium, that "as long as the problems of the poor are not radically resolved by rejecting the absolute autonomy of markets and financial speculation and by attacking the structural causes of inequality, no solution will be found for the world's problems or, for that matter, to any problems." He later declared that "inequality is the root of social evil."

When income inequality is low, aggregate demand will be relatively high, because more people who want ordinary consumer goods and services will be able to afford them, while the labor force will not be as relatively monopolized by the wealthy.

=== Effects on social welfare ===
In most Western democracies, the desire to eliminate or reduce economic inequality is generally associated with the political left. One practical argument in favor of reduction is that economic inequality undermines social cohesion and increases social unrest, thereby weakening society. There is evidence that this is true (see inequity aversion), and it is intuitive, at least for small face-to-face groups. Alberto Alesina, Rafael Di Tella, and Robert MacCulloch found in a 2001 study that inequality negatively affects happiness in Europe but not in the United States.

It has also been argued that economic inequality invariably translates to political inequality, which further aggravates the problem. Even when an increase in economic inequality leaves no one poorer, greater resource inequality is disadvantageous, as it can lead to a shift in power by increasing inequality in the ability to participate in democratic processes. According to Paul and Moser, countries with high income inequality and poor unemployment protections experience worse mental health outcomes among the unemployed.

=== Capabilities approach ===
The capabilities approach – sometimes called the human development approach – looks at income inequality and poverty as a form of "capability deprivation". Unlike neoliberalism, which "defines well-being as utility maximization", economic growth and income are considered a means to an end rather than the end itself. Its goal is to "wid[en] people's choices and the level of their achieved well-being" through increasing functioning (the things a person values doing), capabilities (the freedom to enjoy functionings) and agency (the ability to pursue valued goals).

When a person's capabilities are diminished, they are, in some way, deprived of earning as much income as they otherwise would. An old, ill man cannot earn as much as a healthy young man; gender roles and customs may prevent a woman from receiving an education or working outside the home. There may be an epidemic that causes widespread panic, or there could be rampant violence in the area that prevents people from going to work for fear of their lives. As a result, income inequality increases, and it becomes more difficult to reduce the gap without additional aid.

=== Societal acceptance ===
A 2022 study published in Perspectives on Psychological Science found that in countries where neoliberal institutions have significant influence over policies, the psychology of those populations is shaped to have both a higher tolerance for large levels of income inequality and a preference for it over more egalitarian outcomes.

According to a January 2025 Pew Research Center report, the majority of adults across 36 countries say that economic inequality is a major problem, along with the undue political influence of the wealthy.

=== Public perception and accuracy thereof ===
In the US, a 2011 study found a significant discrepancy between the measured wealth distribution and the public's understanding of it. The actual wealth going to the top quintile in 2011 was around 84%, whereas the average amount of wealth that the general public estimated to go to the top quintile was around 58%.

In a 2026 Pew Research Center survey of 5,166 U.S. adults, 61% said there was too much economic inequality in the United States, unchanged from 2019. The share was 78% among Democrats and Democratic-leaning independents and 42% among Republicans and Republican-leaning independents.

=== Arguments that economic inequality is not a problem ===
The majority of researchers who analyze economic inequality argue that today's levels are problematic and deserve some mitigation. There are however, some who disagree, and feel that current levels of inequality are necessary because it encourages individuals to gain useful skills and take risks, thereby encouraging growth and innovation, which are necessary for progress. Some have also argued that economic inequality is a natural and fair outcome in market economies, in which the rewards are distributed based on different economic contributions because individuals have different attitudes and talents. Many who feel that economic inequality is not a significant issue are associated with conservative or libertarian think tanks funded by corporations and the wealthy like The Heritage Foundation, the Manhattan Institute, the Cato Institute or the American Enterprise Institute, who may also feel that policies which would reduce inequality are direct attacks on their favored version of capitalism, laissez-faire capitalism. In addition, some feel that economic inequality has not actually increased significantly.

== See also ==
- Anti-capitalism
- Aporophobia
- Class struggle
- Criticism of capitalism
- Cycle of poverty
- Donor Class
- Economic anxiety
- Economic democracy
- Economic equilibrium
- Economic migrant
- Economic security
- Equal opportunity
- Geography and wealth
- Great Divergence, disproportionate economic advancement of Europe
- Historic recurrence
- Human Development Index
- Humanistic economics
- Income inequality metrics
- Inequality for All
- International inequality
- List of sovereign states by wealth inequality
- List of countries by income inequality
- List of countries by wealth per adult
- Occupy movement
- Paradise Papers
- Plutonomy
- Poverty map
- Poverty reduction
- Precariat
- Precarious work
- Social inequality
- Spatial inequality
- Tax haven
- The Greatest of All Plagues
- Theories of poverty
- Yard-sale model
