= Consumption distribution =

Measure of economic inequality

Consumption disparity in major cities

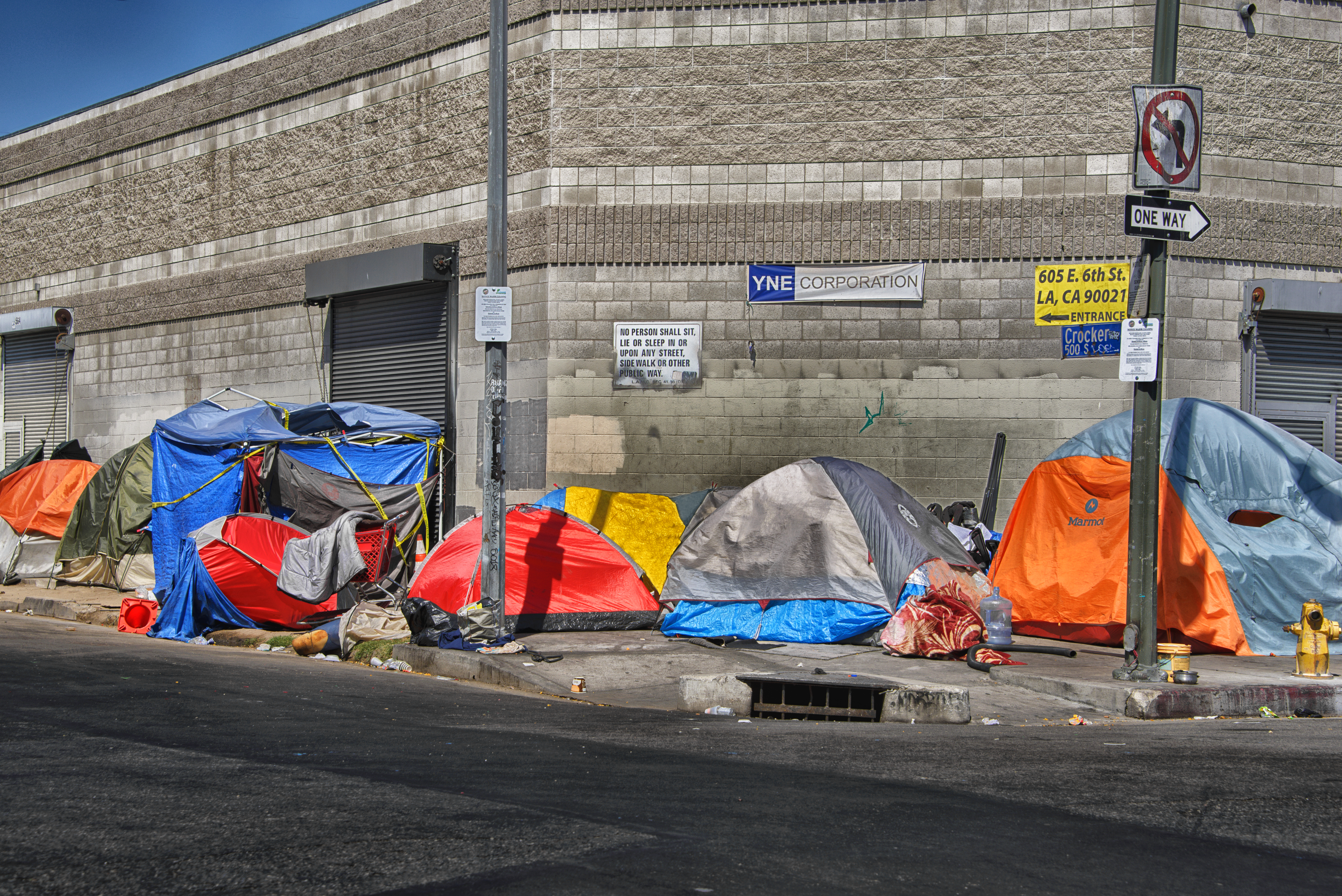
Tents of the homeless on the sidewalk in Skid Row, Los Angeles

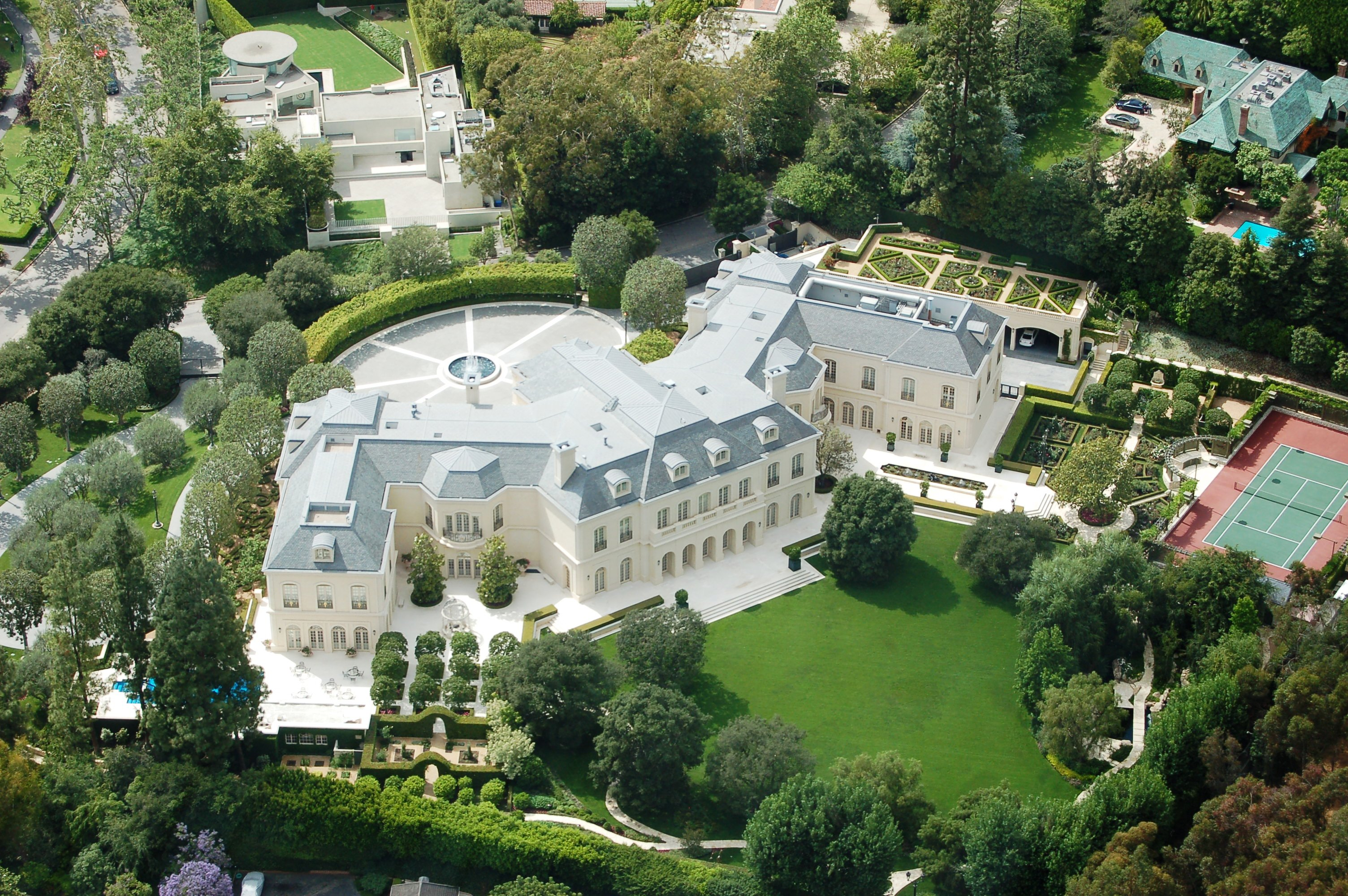
An affluent house in Holmby Hills, Los Angeles, roughly 12 miles from downtown (above)

In economics, the consumption distribution or consumption inequality is an alternative to the income distribution or wealth distribution for judging economic inequality, comparing levels of consumption or spending rather than income or wealth. This is an important measure of inequality as the basic utility of the wealth or income is the expenditure. People experience the inequality directly in consumption, rather than income or wealth. World Bank lists 118 countries based on consumption inequality compared to 68 countries based on income inequality.

== See also ==
- Asset
- Economic inequality
- Gini coefficient
- Income
- Lorenz curve
- Wealth concentration
- Wealth (economics)
- Wealth
