= History of economic inequality =

The history of economic inequality is the study of the evolution of the uneven distribution of wealth or income throughout history between groups in a society, or between societies.

== Theories ==
According to Simon Kuznets, the rise in inequality is unavoidable with the onset of the Industrial Revolution, as it requires a dense concentration of capital to enable industrialisation. Afterwards, the level of inequality will decrease over time as industrialists need to employ qualified laborers to complete ever more complex tasks. Thus, wages increase.

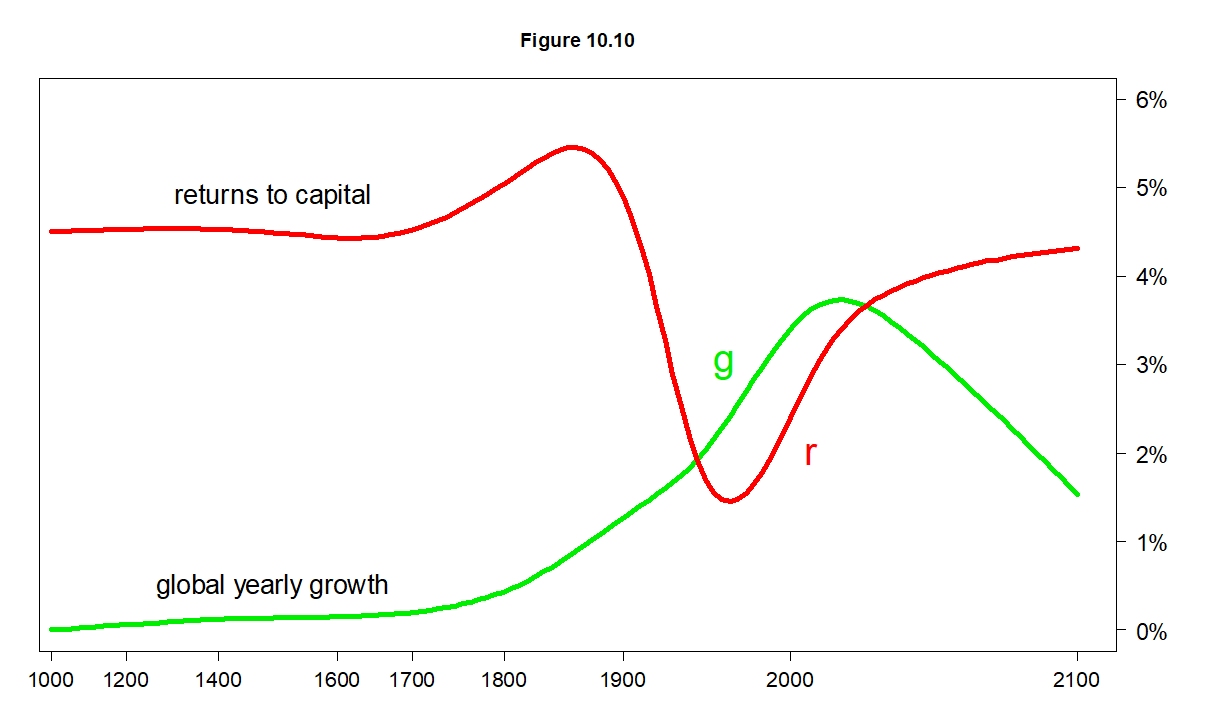
Thomas Piketty argues that inequality of wealth tends to increase over time empirically. Sole exception throughout history was the era following the end of World War II.

Economist Branko Milanović challenges this "naturalistic" approach to the evolution of inequality, arguing that it is not natural but solely the product of industrial disputes. Thomas Piketty goes as far as stating that the historical rise or decrease in inequality in capitalism is but contingent, and that industrial dispute and ideology are the means to transform the evolution of inequality within society.

== Prehistory and first civilizations ==
The history of economic inequality goes as far back as the history of civilizations and military conquests. American economist Thorstein Veblen states that the first "barbarian" civilizations wage war when they meet one another because of resource scarcity, which fosters a "predatory spirit". Glory and theft became masculine virtues, as the most physically able were sent to the front lines to fight. Veblen explains that this predatory spirit initiated inequality of gender, for at some point men began to consider women of the enemy tribe as genuine war trophies, thus implying objectivisation and economic domination of women by men.

== Antiquity ==
Milton Friedman argues that from antiquity to nowadays, in every country, the governors of societies have used the creation of money to unofficially, quickly, and arbitrarily impose very heavy taxes, thereby increasing the power and wealth of the governors to the detriment of the common people. By way of example, in the 4th century, the state of Constantinople devalued its copper currency, largely owned by the poor, in favor of the rich, thus increasing economic inequalities between rich and poor people.

== Middle Ages ==
=== Europe ===
According to Stephen Rigby, an economist specializing in medieval economic history, the conservative ideology of 12th-, 13th-, and 14th-century Europe justified the level of inequality, particularly by denouncing sharp wage increases as a challenge to the feudal social order. Rigby points out that intellectuals of the time relied heavily on the Bible and Aristotle's theses. As such, taking up Aristotelian theories, (Note: « Giles's defence of social hierarchy was thus based on Aristotle's claim that, "from the hour of their births, some men are marked out for subjection, others for rule". (Aristotle, Politics, ed. by Everson, I. 5 (p. 16)) ») the theologian Gilles de Rome asserted in the 13th century that economic inequalities were the natural product of the hierarchy between men, and that transforming the current social order would be an arbitrary, artificial decision, being contrary to natural peacefulness where men earn according to their ranking and their "social merit". Knighthood was thus worthy of all their wealth, since they were morally and physically superior to the peasantry, being ready to defend the community by the sword, which would mean a purer soul. 14th-century philosopher Christine de Pizan emphasizes that the social order was God's chosen system: being born a peasant meant that God had specifically decided to make one a peasant, so one must obey the social order and hierarchy to follow God's plans.

Nevertheless, Rigby notes that in reality, the unequal social order was constantly challenged by medieval peasants. For instance, peasants sometimes worked more slowly or despoiled their masters as a form of resistance to the hierarchy.

== 19th century ==
=== Revolutionary era ===
After the French Revolution, market spirit invaded every aspect of European lives, notably the soil.

In France, the Allarde decree of 1791 granted everyone the freedom to pursue economic activities according to their own judgment. As a result, peasants who owned certain plots of land could exclude other peasants, for instance, through partition, who depended on landowners' solidarity to let their livestock graze on the rest of the harvest. In this way, solidarity and social ties were broken, and inequalities between individuals increased rapidly.

Up to the beginning of the Gilded Age and the Industrial Revolution, the United States was a relatively equal country, thanks to a rapidly growing demography, which prevented the emergence of rent.

=== Industrial Revolution ===
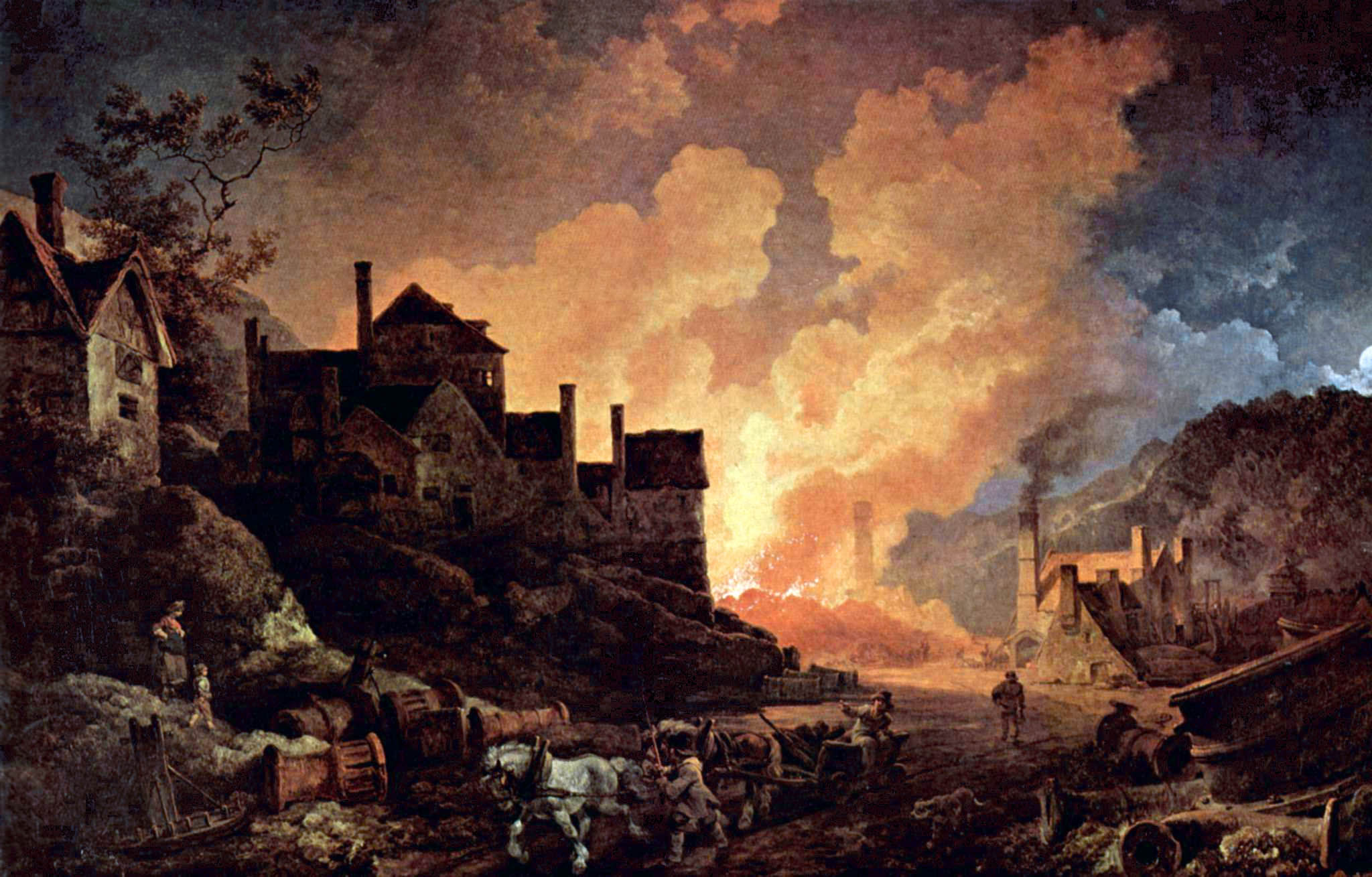
The first Industrial Revolution, historical era of extreme economic inequality.

While economic growth was dazzling thanks to the Industrial Revolution (it averaged 1.6%, compared with 0.3% in previous centuries), European societies were transformed into genuine rentier societies, with ever-increasing inequalities: Great Britain, Sweden and France became the three most unequal countries in history, with the top 10% of the population owning an average of 91%, 88% and 84% of national wealth respectively, while the bottom half of the population owned 1%, 1% and 2% of national wealth respectively. The most unequal city in History is Paris, where the wealth of the richest 1% rose from 49.4% to 66.5% of the city's total wealth between 1810 and 1910, while over the same period the wealth of the poorest 50% of households fell from 1.3% to 0.2%.

Worldwide speaking, the ratio of income held by the richest 10% to that held by the poorest 50% rose from 1800% to 4100% between 1820 and 1900.

Conditions were so precarious that children as young as 4 were hired to perform particularly dangerous tasks in the textile and mining industries. By 1840, the life expectancy of French workers had dropped from 24 to 19 years, relative to 1740. Nevertheless, on March 22, 1841, Villermé's work prompted the French government to pass the "Loi relative au travail des enfants employés dans les manufactures, usines et ateliers" law, abolishing work for children under 8 years of age, work exceeding 8 hours a day for children aged 8 to 12, and work exceeding 12 hours a day for children aged 12 to 16. Until the end of the 19th century, similar laws were passed in England, the United States, Denmark, Switzerland, Belgium, Italy, and the Netherlands.

Daron Acemoğlu considers that the "nature of technology" didn't have a neutral role in the evolution of inequality during the Industrial Revolution: increasingly efficient automation began to replace workers, worsening their working conditions, stagnating wages, and increasing working hours by up to 20%. Weavers were the hardest hit by automation: in England, hourly wages fell by 30 to 40%.

From the Gilded Age onwards, the emergence of trusts brought inequality in North America closer to that of European societies: in 1920, 2% of Americans owned 50% of the country's wealth, while two-thirds of the poorest owned almost nothing.

== 20th century ==
=== Pre-war Era ===
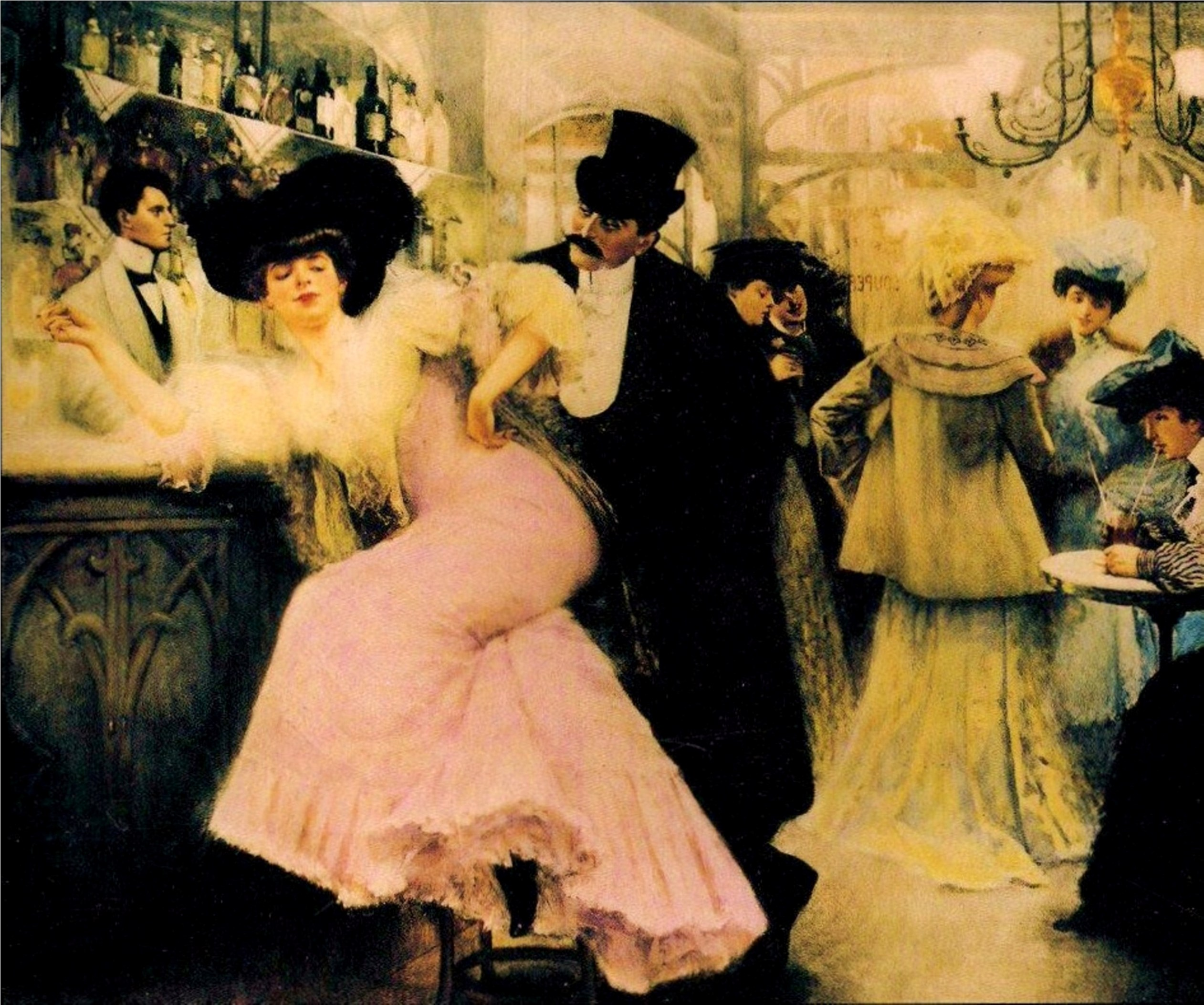
"La Belle Époque": the hike in inequality in Europe.

The figures revealed at the beginning of the twentieth century flabbergasted a majority of economists, statisticians, and politicians: In 1919, Irving Fisher, a liberal, put the question of extreme inequality at the heart of current stakes in the United States, as this hyper-unequal distribution would threaten the very foundations of American society. He proposed as a solution to tax direct inheritance by one-third, inheritance from grandparents by two-thirds, and inheritance from great-grandparents by the full amount; or the President of the French National Assembly, Joseph Caillaux, also a liberal, who confessed to being deeply shocked by the figures on the situation in France, and succeeded in convincing a majority of deputies to pass the first progressive income tax, before the Senate vetoed it in 1909:

Nous avons été conduits à croire, à dire que la France était le pays des petites fortunes, du capital émietté et dispersé jusqu'à l'infini. Les statistiques que le nouveau régime successoral nous fournit nous obligent à en singulièrement rabattre. [...] Si l'on estime, dis-je, à 200 milliards la fortune en capital possédée par les Français, on s'aperçoit que 27% de ce total, soit 55 milliards, sont entre les mains de 18.000 personnes [pour une population de 41,2 millions de Français], et que 37% du même total, 75 milliards, sont entre les mains de 45.000 personnes. On constate enfin que les six dixièmes du capital national, représentant 120 milliards, sont entre les mains de 260.000 personnes. [...] Messieurs, je ne puis dissimuler que ces chiffres ont pu dans mon esprit modifier quelques-uns de ces idées préconçues auxquelles je faisais allusion tout à l'heure, qu'ils m'ont conduit à certaines réflexions. Le fait est qu'un nombre fort restreint de personnes détiennent la plus grande partie de la fortune du pays.

— Joseph Caillaux in 1907–1908 during Parlementary debates, L'impôt sur le revenu, 1910, p. 530-532

If politicians allowed this increase in inequality, it was first and foremost because France was seen as a country of small property owners, and it was unacceptable to involve the State in the economy. It was therefore out of the question to apply a progressive tax, which would have made it possible to tax large fortunes more and more, to the point of calling into question the notion of property, according to governments. In fact, France was the most backward country when it came to equality issues, since, according to politicians, it was the pioneer of equality, as it was at the origin of the French Revolution, so social issues were not necessary, preventing any questioning in this area.

In 1914 in Europe, overall the top 10% of wealthholders owned 90% of total wealth.

=== Cold War ===
The post-war period was one of relative economic equality for both the Western and Eastern blocs.

==== Western Bloc ====
===== Golden age of the welfare state =====
The Great Depression drastically changed many economists' and politicians' perceptions of capitalism, while the Second World War required massive reparations and reinvestment. As a result, many countries set about developing the welfare state in the second half of the 20th century.

Against a backdrop of extremely high inflation caused by the Second World War, and a very high level of capital destroyed by bombing, governments had no choice but to intervene on a massive scale to repair the damage done by the war, by making massive investments in the population as a whole. The result was the "Fordist compromise", (Note: Term coined by Michel Aglietta to describe the sharp rise in productivity made possible by Fordism, combined with the indexation of wages to productivity.) a high level of consumption spending, mass school enrolment and an easing of economic activity due to the collapse of a rent-based economy through inflation and bombing. These various phenomena triggered exceptional economic growth in the developed countries during the Thirty Glorious Years. Thus economic growth was driven by equality.

Daron Acemoğlu argues that 21st-century Fordism opened up new tasks to workers each time a task was automated, effectively increasing workers' wages, unlike in the nineteenth century, thereby increasing consumption, and therefore the income of companies, which then began to produce more, and so on, forging a virtuous circle between economic growth and economic equality.

This decline in inequality has led to the emergence of a middle-class homeowner. The wealth of the poorest 50% has risen to 5% of national net wealth, while that of the middle 40% (those between the richest 10% and the poorest 50%), which can be associated with the middle class, has risen to 45%.

In France, this era of prosperity was not disconnected from a certain form of mixed economy blending capitalism and socialism. At its peak, 30% of national capital was nationalized, and this rate rose to almost 50% for industrial capital.

Anglo-Saxon countries are particularly keen on this spirit of equality, and were the first to set up the welfare state: the United States introduced the Social Security Act (SSA) in 1935 and the Fair Labor Standards Act (FLSA) in 1938, and England the National Health Service (NHS) in 1948. These two countries also have the highest marginal tax rates in history, reaching a threshold of 84% and 94% respectively; over the period 1932–1980, the top marginal income tax rate in the United States averaged 81%.

===== Liberal revival =====
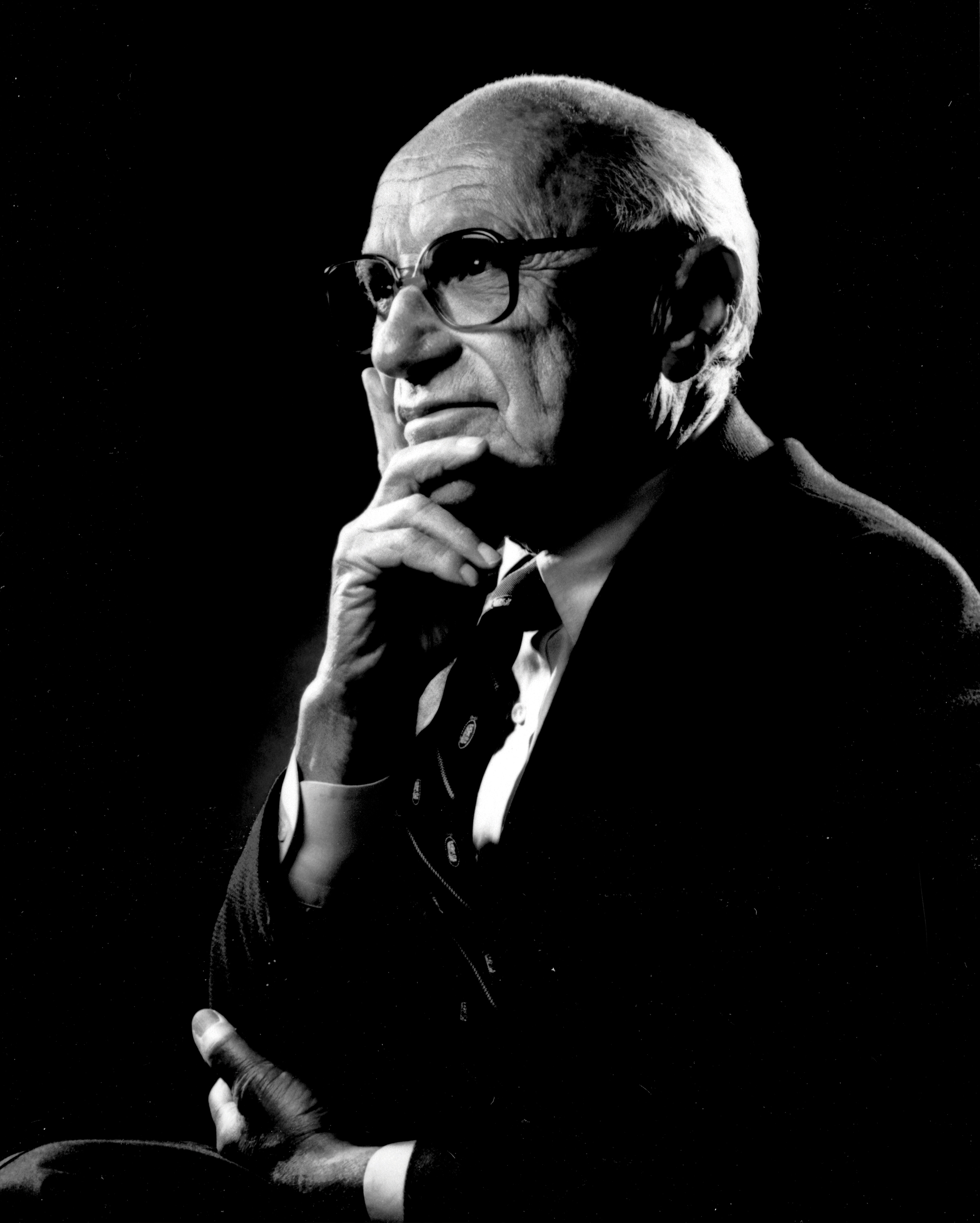
Milton Friedman, one of the main contributors to the liberal revival.

The context of stagflation in the 70s and 80s seemed to call into question the usefulness of the welfare state, prompting the emergence of a neoliberal movement led by economist Milton Friedman. From the 1980s onwards, this led to lower taxes and the privatization of public enterprises in developed countries, notably under the impetus of Ronald Reagan in the US, Margaret Thatcher in the UK, Helmut Schmidt in Germany, and Jacques Delors in France.

From 1980 to 2000, the top income tax rate in OECD countries fell from 58% to 50.3%, then dropped to 42.5% in 2021.

Milton Friedman condones these privatizations and tax cuts by explaining that the state is as inefficient, if not less so, than private enterprise, and that negative taxation is preferable to progressive taxation, since the latter would discourage the richest from working. (Note: Milton Friedman claims that the negative income tax combines the advantages of both progressive and proportional taxation, since the negative income tax would be socially fairer and less disincentive because marginal taxation would be constant: an additional income of $500 or $1,000 would be taxed at the same percentage. Friedman's negative income tax has been widely publicized and successful in the USA since 1962, and the principle is still relevant today.)

Yet, according to Thomas Piketty, there is no statistically significant evidence that this rise in inequality and the lower taxation of the wealthiest have boosted growth since the 1980s.

==== Eastern Bloc ====
===== Communist era =====
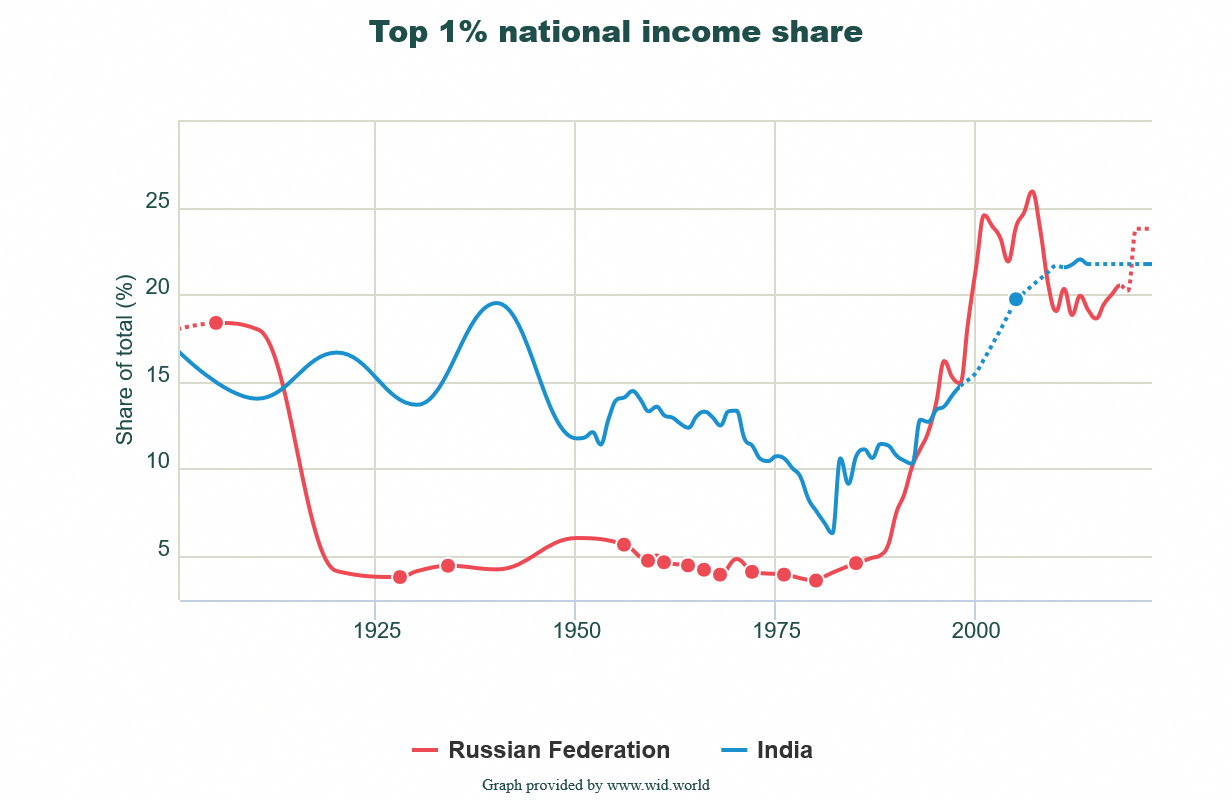
Share of the top 1% income in Russia and India, 1900–2022.

The Soviet system in the USSR is economically very equal, so in Soviet Russia, Filip Novokmet estimates that the top 10% of income earners held 2.2 to 2.7 times the national average income (compared with 4.5 times in 2015 in Russia); the top 1% of income earners held 3.5 to 5.5 times the national average income (compared with 20 times in 2015 in Russia).

Thomas Piketty nevertheless qualifies these figures: a large proportion of inequality in the USSR can be found in payments in kind, notably in the form of housing gifts, passes... in short, privileges that are difficult to quantify.

Jacques Sapir, an economist specializing in the Russian economy, believes that although economic gender inequalities were officially insignificant, the existence of a Black market in which men were the majority participants, while women took care of household chores, greatly increased economic gender inequalities. (Note: According to Jacques Sapir, illegal work (i.e., working in the underground economy) earned double or triple that of legal work. A quick calculation shows that a man's income was three to four times a woman's.)

===== Post-communist era =====
The collapse of the Soviet bloc in 1991 prompted liberal economists from both the Soviet and capitalist blocs to privatize the former communist countries as quickly as possible, in particular by means of a shock therapy known as voucher privatization, whereby all rights to collectivized enterprises are distributed fairly to all, who can freely sell their property rights for a given price.

Thomas Piketty argues that voucher privatization prompted wealthy landowners to buy up a large number of property rights, thereby rapidly increasing inequality in post-Soviet countries, a policy that is at the root of the Russian oligarchy. He deplores the fact that a third way, different from the "communist disaster" and the ultra-liberal logic, has not been adopted.

== 21st century ==
Since the liberal revival, inequality has been rising worldwide. Granted, poverty and extreme poverty declined, but inequalities between developed and developing countries, between capitalists and workers, and between low-skilled and highly skilled workers have risen sharply. Between 1980 and 2021, the income of the richest 10% in Europe rose from 27% to 36%, and in the United States from 35% to 47%.

Globally, the poorest 50% hold 2% of the world's wealth, (Note: In 1995, they held 1.5% of the wealth.) compared with 76% for the richest 10%, of which 38% goes to the richest 1%, and 12% to the richest 0.01%. (Note: In 1995, the latter accounted for 7.5% of the world's wealth.) As a result, wealth inequality will have increased by 50% between the poorest 50% and the richest 0.01% between 2008 and 2022.

Many economists fear that inequalities will continue to grow in the 21st century unless governments intervene on a massive scale.

=== Present day ===
The United States is experiencing in the 21st century an unprecedented level of inequality: whereas on the eve of the Great Depression – which was partly caused by inequalities between workers and capitalists – the richest 1% owned 24% of the country's income, in 2019 this rate is 27%. It's worth pointing out that from 1980 to 2015, where the incomes of the poorest 50% of Americans stagnated perfectly, (Note: In real terms of 2015, in 1980 the average income of the poorest 50% was $15,988, compared with $16,186 in 2015, a real increase of $198.) the incomes of the richest 1% tripled. (Note: In real terms of 2015, in 1980, the average income of the richest 1% was $428,781, compared with $1,305,301 in 2015, a real increase of 204%, or an annual increase in real income of 3.2%.)

In 2005, the Gini index rose to 0.70 from 0.65 worldwide. More specifically, in the United States, from 1970 to 2018, the Gini coefficient associated with net incomes rose from 0.65 to 0.75, while in France this coefficient fell from 0.37 to 0.29. As for economic growth, the World Inequality Lab estimates that since 1995, 38% has benefited multimillionaires, compared with 2% of growth benefiting the world's poorest 50%, and since 2020, two-thirds of growth has benefited the richest 1%.

Lucas Chancel estimates that in 2021, the top 10% of the world's income earners will have 5.2 times the average income, while the poorest half of the population will earn 0.17 times the world average. The economist also analyses that, while income inequalities between countries have been reduced since 1982, inequalities within countries have increased.

This rise in inequality is partly explained by the development of tax havens and shell companies, which have prompted governments to reduce tax rates to prevent the wealthiest from fleeing the country. In fact, a 10% increase in the tax rate reduces the number of top foreign athletes in the same country by the same amount. In fact, in the Nordic countries, the richest 0.1% place 30% of the taxes they are supposed to pay in tax havens.

And yet, tax havens could be tackled quite easily, notably through the introduction of a global tax, regulations on law firms, and sanctions against countries that refuse to be fiscally transparent. According to Gabriel Zucman, the failure to combat tax havens is not due to a lack of solutions, but to a deliberate political choice.

As for gender inequalities, excluding China, economic inequalities between men and women have been steadily narrowing worldwide since 1990, although equal parity is far from being achieved: on average, men earned 2.22 times more than women in 1990, compared with 1.86 times more today.

Since 2010, in response to rising inequality, ecological pressures, and, in some countries, lower taxes on the rich than on the middle classes, groups of hundreds of millionaires around the globe have been calling for governments to tax them more. These include the Anglo-American group Patriotic Millionaires, created in 2010, the Austro-German group Tax me now, created in 2022, and the international group Proud to pay more, which signed an open letter at the World Economic Forum in Davos in 2023 and 2024. These groups are made up of young millionaires who are more aware of the issues of climate, taxation, inequality, and global poverty, as economist Dominique Plihon explains: "The new generation [of millionaires] is also more aware of the convergence of crises. Climate crisis, fiscal crisis, economic crisis and democratic crisis are intrinsically linked, which makes the new generation all the more keen to change things", however, according to Dominique Plihon, another more likely underlying reason would be to seek to mitigate the resolution of extreme inequalities so as not to be taxed too much in the future.

=== Forecasts ===
Thomas Piketty laments not so much our current situation as the trend we're heading towards; as the United States has demonstrated, there is a great risk that developed countries will massively apply liberal policies in the future until they return to a level of inequality close to that of the early 20th century, which will make it all the more difficult for developing countries to create a strong state to invest in human capital. This trend risks recreating a "rentier society" where elites remain the same, innovation is slow, and the economy is sclerotic.

Artificial intelligence is also likely to significantly increase economic inequality, as school enrolment has stopped growing, benefiting wealthy wage earners and digital companies. According to some estimates, artificial intelligence could not only increase inequalities, but also make workers more precarious: in 2014–2015, it was estimated that 7% of skilled jobs and 45% of jobs in general would be threatened by 2050, but these figures date from before the acceleration in the development of artificial intelligence since OpenAI, an IMF study from 2024 considers that 60% of jobs will be seriously threatened by artificial intelligence in developed countries by 2040 (compared with 40% on a global scale), although the IMF explains that this could lead to a significant increase in employees' income if artificial intelligence is used to complete their tasks.

Economist Daron Acemoğlu fears that the aim is not to complete and facilitate workers' tasks, but to make them compete, to substitute them with artificial intelligence; he believes that the machine no longer makes it possible these days to unlock new tasks, which ends up purely substituting for the worker leading to unemployment, even though the worker is for the moment more productive than artificial intelligence.

== Bibliography ==
- Piketty, Thomas (2014) [2013]. Capital in the Twenty-First Century. Harvard University Press. ISBN 978-0674430006.
- Piketty, Thomas (2020) [2019]. Capital and Ideology. Harvard University Press. ISBN 978-2-02-133804-1.
- Acemoglu, Daron (2023). Power and Progress: Our Thousand-Year Struggle Over Technology and Prosperity. PublicAffairs. ISBN 978-1541702530.
