= The Greatest of All Plagues =

2024 book by David Lay Williams

- Author: David Lay Williams
- Subject: Economic inequality
- Publisher: Princeton University Press
- Publication date: 2024
- ISBN: 9780691171975

The Greatest of All Plagues is a 2024 book by David Lay Williams, tracking how economic inequality has been treated by great thinkers of the Western canon.

The title is a reference to Plato, who mentioned "the greatest of all plagues" in his dialogue Laws. (Note: Strictly, it's civil war that Plato called "the greatest of all plagues", but according to Williams in the introduction of his book, Plato considered economic inequality to be the main cause of civil war (p. 11).) Williams wrote the book in part as he believes commentary on economic inequality has long missed the fact that the West's top political thinkers, not just its lowly workers, have been persistent critics of accumulated wealth.

At least in the advanced economies, from the late 1940s to mid 1970s, economic growth delivered benefits which were broadly shared across the earnings spectrums, with inequality falling as the poorest sections of society increased their incomes at a faster rate than the richest. But this trend did not hold, with economic inequality rising in recent decades. (Note: Williams uses the data gathered by Thomas Blanchet, Emmanuel Saez and Gabriel Zucman in their Realtime Inequality project, available online at https://realtimeinequality.org/. The starting point of the dataset is 1976.)

== Synopsis ==
The book has an introduction, a conclusion, and seven main chapters: each dedicated to one great thinker and their thoughts on inequality.

In the Introduction, Williams cites the findings of Thomas Piketty and his associates to state that after an anomalous short period after World War II, economic inequality has been rising for the last five decades (pp. 1–2). In contrast to the Austrian School economists Friedrich Hayek and Milton Friedman, who claimed that the Western canon supported the inequality existing throughout history (p. 6), he argues for a "long Western tradition of criticizing economic inequality" (p. 3). He chooses to present "seven central figures in this tradition", selected for their familiarity (p. 3). He explains that these thinkers not only considered economic inequality a problem but also took pains to elaborate why that was the case (p. 4). He notes that the concern is not restricted to the Western tradition as Confucius, for example, wrote that a wise ruler "worries not about poverty, but about uneven distribution" (pp. 8–9).

Chapter one focuses on Plato, whom Williams considers the first major philosopher of the Western tradition. He concedes that Plato is often considered an elitist, but notes this did not prevent him from being deeply concerned about economic inequality. Williams says Plato's over-arching goals were on promoting civil harmony, friendship and fraternal bonds – which he considered were incompatible with too much economic inequality. In the Republic, Plato stated that wealth inequalities within a civic community lead to the emergence of "two [cities] … at war with one another: the city of the poor and that of the rich" (p. 28–29). Williams relates various ideal and practical ideas Plato had for improving economic egalitarianism, such as restricting "the wealthiest class of citizens [to] have no more than four times the property of the poorest citizens" (p. 42).

Chapter two focuses on Jesus Christ. Williams sketches some of the background useful for understanding what Jesus had to say on inequality, such as Hebrew laws relating to the Sabbatical and to jubilee where debts were to be forgiven.

Chapters three to six, respectively, cover the views of Thomas Hobbes, Jean-Jacques Rousseau, Adam Smith and John Stuart Mill. Hobbes is shown to regard concentration of wealth as a threat to political stability. Noted are Adam Smith's concerns about the collusion of capitalists in keeping wages low, about the effects of repetitive menial labour on civic competencies, and about the morally corrupting influence of admiring the rich.

Chapter seven considers the work of Karl Marx, whom Williams says is widely understood to be the West's greatest critic of inequality.

The Conclusion starts with a discussion of various prominent commentators of the 20th and 21st centuries who had inaccurately asserted that concern about inequality was a recent development. It summarises the lessons of previous work on inequality, drawing from the seven selected thinkers and also the work of other historic and contemporary experts.

== Reception ==
The book met with positive reception. Lilly Goren described it as "a magnum opus." Nick Romeo of The Washington Post calls the book impressive, noting that the author does not just track intellectual history related to economic inequality, he "makes a persuasive case that these thinkers were right to be so troubled". Samuel Moyn for The Nation described the book as "an excellent new survey", noting that a central question it addresses is why anger on economic inequality has become "pivotal not just for small groups like the Levellers but also for millions in modern times—or why Occupy, "Pikettymania", and Sanders helped revive a consciousness of it". Arab News noted that the book demonstrates that economic inequality "has been a central preoccupation of some of the most eminent political thinkers of the Western intellectual tradition."

In a largely positive review, Ben Burgis regretted that Williams did not spend more time explaining the differences between the featured thinkers, especially Plato and Marx. Similarly, political scientist Matt McManus, writing for the Jacobin magazine, criticised the book for restricting itself to the received canon and thus missing a chance to introduce "important socialist and social democratic thinkers" to the general public.

New Statesman reported that the author describes how "Plato, Hobbes, Rousseau, Marx, and others saw inequality as a clear and present threat to both personal character and political stability."
